The Italian Athletics Championships is an annual outdoor track and field competition organised by the Federazione Italiana di Atletica Leggera (FIDAL), which serves as the Italian national championship for the sport. It is typically held as a two-day event in the Italian summer around late June to early August. The venue of the championships is decided on an annual basis. The winners have been Italian nationals.

The competition was first held in 1906 and has been held each year since with the exception of 1915–1917, and 1944. The first women's events were held in 1923.

Men

Track

100 metres

1906: Umberto Barozzi
1907: Umberto Barozzi (2)
1908: Umberto Barozzi (3)
1909: Guido Brignone
1910: Franco Giongo
1911: Franco Giongo (2)
1912: Franco Giongo (3)
1913: Francesco Carturan
1914: Franco Giongo (4)
1915–1918: not held
1919: Vittorio Zucca
1920: Vittorio Zucca (2)
1921: Giorgio Croci
1922: Vittorio Zucca (3)
1923: Franco Giongo (5)
1924: Ruggero Maregatti
1925: Ruggero Maregatti (2)
1926: Alberto D'Agostino
1927: Franco Reyser
1928: Edgardo Toetti
1929: Edgardo Toetti (2)
1930: Edgardo Toetti (3)
1931: Edgardo Toetti (4)
1932: Edgardo Toetti (5)
1933: Orazio Mariani
1934: Edgardo Toetti (6)
1935: Tullio Gonnelli
1936: Orazio Mariani (2)
1937: Orazio Mariani (3)
1938: Orazio Mariani (4)
1939: Orazio Mariani (5)
1940: Carlo Monti
1941: Carlo Monti (2)
1942: Orazio Mariani (6)
1943: Orazio Mariani (7)
1944: not held
1945: Aldo Santon
1946: Carlo Monti (3)
1947: Carlo Monti (4)
1948: Vittorio Cattoni
1949: Gesualdo Penna
1950: Antonio Siddi
1951: Franco Leccese
1952: Carlo Vittori
1953: Carlo Vittori (2)
1954: Luigi Gnocchi
1955: Luigi Gnocchi (2)
1956: Luigi Gnocchi (3)
1957: Livio Berruti
1958: Livio Berruti (2)
1959: Livio Berruti (3)
1960: Livio Berruti (4)
1961: Livio Berruti (5)
1962: Livio Berruti (6)
1963: Sergio Ottolina
1964: Sergio Ottolina (2)
1965: Pasquale Giannattasio
1966: Pasquale Giannattasio (2)

1968: Ennio Preatoni
1969: Pasqualino Abeti
1970: Ennio Preatoni (2)
1971: Norberto Oliosi
1972: Vincenzo Guerini
1973: Luigi Benedetti
1974: Pietro Mennea
1975: Pasqualino Abeti (2)
1976: Vincenzo Guerini (2)
1977: Luciano Caravani
1978: Pietro Mennea (2)
1979: Mauro Zuliani
1980: Pietro Mennea (3)
1981: Diego Nodari
1982: Pierfrancesco Pavoni
1983: Pierfrancesco Pavoni (2)
1984: Stefano Tilli
1985: Carlo Simionato
1986: Stefano Tilli (2)
1987: Pierfrancesco Pavoni (3)
1988: Antonio Ullo
1989: Stefano Tilli (3)
1990: Stefano Tilli (4)
1991: Ezio Madonia
1992: Stefano Tilli (5)
1993: Ezio Madonia (2)
1994: Sandro Floris
1995: Giovanni Puggioni
1996: Giovanni Puggioni (2)
1997: Stefano Tilli (6)
1998: Francesco Scuderi
1999: Andrea Colombo
2000: Francesco Scuderi (2)
2001: Francesco Scuderi (3)
2002: Francesco Scuderi (4)
2003: Francesco Scuderi (5)
2004: Simone Collio
2005: Simone Collio (2)
2006: Luca Verdecchia
2007: Koura Kaba Fantoni
2008: Fabio Cerutti
2009: Simone Collio (3)
2010: Simone Collio (4)
2011: Matteo Galvan
2012: Fabio Cerutti (2)
2013: Delmas Obou 
2014: Delmas Obou (2) 
2015: Fabio Cerutti (3)
2016: Filippo Tortu
2017: Federico Cattaneo
2018: Marcell Jacobs
2019: Marcell Jacobs (2)
2020: Marcell Jacobs (3)
2021: Marcell Jacobs (4)
2022: Marcell Jacobs (5)

200 metres

1914: Franco Giongo
1915–1918: not held
1919: Gian Ercole Salvi
1920: Vittorio Zucca
1921: Carlo Mereu
1922: Paolo Bogani
1923: Franco Giongo (2)
1924: Ruggero Maregatti
1925: Enrico Torre
1926: Pietro Pastorino
1927: Franco Reyser
1928: Edgardo Toetti
1929: Ruggero Maregatti (2)
1930: Ruggero Maregatti (3)
1931: Ruggero Maregatti (4)
1932: Edgardo Toetti (2)
1933: Angelo Ferrario
1934: Edgardo Toetti (3)
1935: Tullio Gonnelli
1936: Giancarlo Orio 
1937: Angelo Ferrario (2)
1938: Tullio Gonnelli (2)
1939: Tullio Gonnelli (3)
1940: Tullio Gonnelli (4)
1941: Carlo Monti
1942: Carlo Monti (2)
1943: Orazio Mariani
1944: not held
1945: Aldo Santon
1946: Carlo Monti (3)
1947: Aldo Turrini
1948: Antonio Siddi
1949: Carlo Monti (4)
1950: Franco Leccese
1951: Wolfango Montanari
1952: Luigi Grissi
1953: Lucio Sangermano
1954: Wolfango Montanari (2)
1955: Luigi Gnocchi 
1956: Luigi Gnocchi (2)
1957: Livio Berruti
1958: Livio Berruti (2)
1959: Livio Berruti (3)
1960: Livio Berruti (4)
1961: Livio Berruti (5)
1962: Livio Berruti (6)
1963: Armando Sardi
1964: Sergio Ottolina
1965: Livio Berruti (7)
1966: Sergio Ottolina (2)
1967: Ito Giani
1968: Livio Berruti (8)
1969: Pasqualino Abeti
1970: Giacomo Puosi
1971: Pietro Mennea
1972: Pietro Mennea (2)
1973: Pietro Mennea (3)
1974: Pietro Mennea (4)
1975: Pasqualino Abeti (2)
1976: Pietro Mennea (5)
1977: Pietro Mennea (6)
1978: Pietro Mennea (7)
1979: Pietro Mennea (8)
1980: Pietro Mennea (9)
1981: Giovanni Bongiorni
1982: Carlo Simionato
1983: Pietro Mennea (10)
1984: Pietro Mennea (11)
1985: Carlo Simionato (2)
1986: Stefano Tilli
1987: Pierfrancesco Pavoni
1988: Stefano Tilli (2)
1989: Sandro Floris
1990: Giovanni Puggioni
1991: Stefano Tilli (3)
1992: Giorgio Marras
1993: Giorgio Marras (2)
1994: Giorgio Marras (3)
1995: Angelo Cipolloni
1996: Angelo Cipolloni (2)
1997: Giovanni Puggioni (2)
1998: Carlo Occhiena
1999: Maurizio Checcucci
2000: Alessandro Cavallaro
2001: Marco Torrieri
2002: Emanuele Di Gregorio
2003: Alessandro Cavallaro (2)
2004: Alessandro Attene
2005: Koura Kaba Fantoni
2006: Stefano Anceschi
2007: Andrew Howe
2008: Matteo Galvan 
2009: Roberto Donati
2010: Roberto Donati (2)
2011: Andrew Howe (2)
2012: Andrew Howe (3)
2013: Diego Marani
2014: Davide Manenti
2015: Diego Marani (2)
2016: Fausto Desalu
2017: Fausto Desalu (2)
2018: Davide Re
2019: Antonio Infantino
2020: Antonio Infantino (2)
2021: Fausto Desalu (3)
2022: Diego Pettorossi

400 metres

1907: Umberto Barozzi
1908: Emilio Lunghi
1909: Guido Brignone
1910: Franco Giongo
1911: Franco Giongo (2)
1912: Franco Giongo (3)
1913: Gian Ercole Salvi
1914: Franco Giongo (4)
1915–1918: not held
1919: Gian Ercole Salvi (2)
1920: Giuseppe Bonini
1921: Ermete Alfieri
1922: Guido Cominotto
1923: Guido Cominotto (2)
1924: Alfredo Gargiullo
1925: Luigi Parolini
1926: Luigi Facelli
1927: Alfredo Gargiullo (2)
1928: Ettore Tavernari
1929: Ettore Tavernari (2)
1930: Luigi Facelli (2)
1931: Manfredo Giacomelli 
1932: Ettore Tavernari (3)
1933: Giacomo Carlini
1934: Ettore Tavernari (4)
1935: Ettore Tavernari (5)
1936: Marsilio Rossi
1937: Mario Lanzi
1938: Angelo Ferrari
1939: Ottavio Missoni
1940: Mario Lanzi (2)
1941: Mario Lanzi (3)
1942: Mario Lanzi (4)
1943: Mario Lanzi (5)
1944: not held
1945: Luigi Paterlini
1946: Gioacchino Dorascenzi 
1947: Antonio Siddi
1948: Luigi Paterlini (2)
1949: Antonio Siddi (2)
1950: Baldassare Porto
1951: Antonio Siddi (3)
1952: Vincenzo Lombardo
1953: Antonio Siddi (4)
1954: Vincenzo Lombardo (2)
1955: Vincenzo Lombardo (3)
1956: Renato Panciera
1957: Adriano Loddo
1958: Mario Fraschini
1959: Renato Panciera (2)
1960: Mario Fraschini (2)
1961: Mario Fraschini (3)
1962: Mario Fraschini (4)
1963: Mario Fraschini (5)
1964: Bruno Bianchi
1965: Sergio Bello
1966: Sergio Bello (2)
1967: Sergio Bello (3)
1968: Sergio Bello (4)
1969: Sergio Bello (5)
1970: Furio Fusi
1971: Marcello Fiasconaro
1972: Marcello Fiasconaro (2)
1973: Marcello Fiasconaro (3)
1974: Alfonso Di Guida
1975: Flavio Borghi
1976: Alfonso Di Guida (2)
1977: Alfonso Di Guida (3)
1978: Stefano Malinverni
1979: Stefano Malinverni (2)
1980: Stefano Malinverni (3)
1981: Mauro Zuliani
1982: Mauro Zuliani (2)
1983: Roberto Ribaud
1984: Donato Sabia
1985: Pierfrancesco Pavoni
1986: Mauro Zuliani (3)
1987: Marcello Pantone
1988: not held
1989: Andrea Montanari
1990: Andrea Nuti
1991: Andrea Nuti (2)
1992: Marco Vaccari
1993: Andrea Nuti (3)
1994: Marco Vaccari (2)
1995: Andrea Nuti (4)
1996: Andrea Nuti (5)
1997: Marco Vaccari (3)
1998: Edoardo Vallet
1999: Marco Vaccari (4)
2000: Ashraf Saber
2001: Andrea Barberi
2002: Andrea Barberi (2)
2003: Andrea Barberi (3)
2004: Andrea Barberi (4)
2005: Andrea Barberi (5)
2006: Andrea Barberi (6)and Luca Galletti
2007: Andrea Barberi (7)
2008: Andrea Barberi (8)
2009: Matteo Galvan
2010: Marco Vistalli
2011: Marco Vistalli (2)
2012: Claudio Licciardello
2013: Matteo Galvan (2)
2014: Matteo Galvan (3)
2015: Matteo Galvan (4)
2016: Matteo Galvan (5)
2017: Davide Re 
2018: Davide Re (2)
2019: Matteo Galvan (6)
2020: Edoardo Scotti 
2021: Edoardo Scotti (2)
2022: Edoardo Scotti (3)

800 metres

1913: Gian Ercole Salvi
1914: Emilio Lunghi
1915–1918: not held
1919: Dante Bertoni
1920: Ernesto Ambrosini
1921: Giuseppe Bonini
1922: Guido Cominotto
1923: Guido Cominotto (2)
1924: Guido Cominotto (3)
1925: Giovanni Garaventa
1926: Guido Cominotto (4)
1927: Ettore Tavernari
1928: Ettore Tavernari (2)
1929: Ettore Tavernari (3)
1930: Mario Tognoli
1931: Luigi Beccali 
1932: Ettore Tavernari (4)
1933: Umberto Cerati
1934: Mario Lanzi
1935: Mario Lanzi (2)
1936: Mario Lanzi (3)
1937: Carlo Guasconi
1938: Mario Lanzi (4)
1939: Mario Lanzi (5)
1940: Gioacchino Dorascenzi 
1941: Bruno Donnini 
1942: Mario Lanzi (6)
1943: Mario Lanzi (7)
1944: not held
1945: Giovanni Bard
1946: Mario Lanzi (8)
1947: Egidio Pederzoli 
1948: Aldo Fracassi 
1949: Lorenzo Lunghi
1950: Aldo Fracassi (2)
1951: Aldo Fracassi (3)
1952: Marcello Dani
1953: Vittorio Maggioni
1954: Alvaro Lensi
1955: Giovanni Scavo
1956: Gianfranco Baraldi
1957: Giovanni Scavo (2)
1958: Gianfranco Baraldi (2)
1959: Gianfranco Baraldi (3)
1960: Mario Fraschini
1961: Francesco Bianchi
1962: Francesco Bianchi (2)
1963: Francesco Bianchi (3)
1964: Francesco Bianchi (4)
1965: Francesco Bianchi (5)
1966: Gianfranco Carabelli
1967: Francesco Bianchi (6)
1968: Franco Arese
1969: Franco Arese (2)
1970: Gianni Del Buono
1971: Sandro Castelli
1972: Franco Arese (3)
1973: Franco Arese (4)
1974: Carlo Grippo
1975: Bruno Magnani
1976: Carlo Grippo (2)
1977: Gabriele Ferrero
1978: Carlo Grippo (3)
1979: Carlo Grippo (4)
1980: Carlo Grippo (5)
1981: Carlo Grippo (6)
1982: Gabriele Ferrero (2)
1983: Donato Sabia
1984: Donato Sabia (2)
1985: Alberto Barsotti
1986: Alberto Barsotti (2)
1987: Tonino Viali
1988: Donato Sabia (3)
1989: Tonino Viali (2)
1990: Tonino Viali (3)
1991: Tonino Viali (4)
1992: Andrea Benvenuti
1993: Giuseppe D'Urso
1994: Giuseppe D'Urso (2)
1995: Davide Cadoni
1996: Andrea Giocondi
1997: Andrea Abelli
1998: Andrea Longo
1999: Andrea Longo (2)
2000: Andrea Longo (3)
2001: Andrea Giocondi (2)
2002: Francesco Roncalli
2003: Livio Sciandra
2004: Francesco Roncalli (2)
2005: Andrea Longo (4)
2006: Maurizio Bobbato
2007: Livio Sciandra (2)
2008: Livio Sciandra (3)
2009: Mario Scapini
2010: Lukas Rifesser
201:1 Giordano Benedetti
2012: Giordano Benedetti (2)
2013: Michele Oberti
2014: Giordano Benedetti (3)
2015: Giordano Benedetti (4)
2016: Giordano Benedetti (5)
2017: Stefano Migliorati 
2018: Enrico Brazzale
2019: Simone Barontini  
2020: Simone Barontini (2)
2021: Simone Barontini (3)
2022: Catalin Tecuceanu

1500 metres

1906: Emilio Lunghi
1907–1912: not held
1913: Emilio Lunghi (2)
1914: Mario Candelori
1915–1918: not held
1919: Arturo Porro
1920: Ernesto Ambrosini
1921: Ernesto Ambrosini (2)
1922: Ferruccio Bruni
1923: Disma Ferrario 
1924: Disma Ferrario (2)
1925: Disma Ferrario (3)
1926: Giovanni Garaventa
1927: Angelo Davoli 
1928: Luigi Beccali
1929: Luigi Beccali (2)
1930: Luigi Beccali (3)
1931: Luigi Beccali (4)
1932: Mario Martini
1933: Alfredo Furia 
1934: Luigi Beccali (5)
1935: Luigi Beccali (6)
1936: Luigi Beccali (7)
1937: Mario Martini
1938: Luigi Beccali (8)
1939: Guerrino Vitale
1940: Guerrino Vitale (2)
1941: Guerrino Vitale (3)
1942: Guerrino Vitale (4)
1943: Mario Cosi
1944: not held
1945: Giovanni Bard
1946: Umberto Fiori 
1947: Giovanni Nocco
1948: Umberto Fiori (2)
1949: Angelo Tagliapietra
1950: Rinaldo Molina
1951: Vittorio Maggioni
1952: Vittorio Maggioni (2)
1953: Vittorio Maggioni (3)
1954: Vittorio Maggioni (4)
1955: Gianfranco Baraldi
1956: Gianfranco Baraldi (2)
1957: Gianfranco Baraldi (3)
1958: Gianfranco Baraldi (4)
1959: Alfredo Rizzo
1960: Alfredo Rizzo (2)
1961: Alfredo Rizzo (3)
1962: Francesco Bianchi
1963: Francesco Bianchi (2)
1964: Francesco Bianchi (3)
1965: Francesco Bianchi (4)
1966: Franco Arese
1967: Franco Arese (2)
1968: Franco Arese (3)
1969: Gianni Del Buono
1970: Franco Arese (4)
1971: Renzo Finelli
1972: Giulio Riga
1973: Gianni Del Buono (2)
1974: Luigi Zarcone
1975: Vittorio Fontanella
1976: Vittorio Fontanella (2)
1977: Giacinto De Cataldo
1978: Fulvio Costa
1979: Vittorio Fontanella (3)
1980: Carlo Grippo
1981: Claudio Patrignani
1982: Claudio Patrignani (2)
1983: Claudio Patrignani (3)
1984: Claudio Patrignani (4)
1985: Stefano Mei
1986: Alessandro Lambruschini
1987: Claudio Patrignani (5)
1988: Davide Tirelli
1989: Davide Tirelli (2)
1990: Gennaro Di Napoli
1991: Gennaro Di Napoli (2)
1992: Gennaro Di Napoli (3)

1994: Tonino Viali
1995: Massimo Pegoretti
1996: Roberto Baderna
1997: Andrea Abelli
1998: Lorenzo Lazzari
1999: Lorenzo Lazzari (2)
2000: Christian Obrist
2001: Lorenzo Lazzari (3)
2002: Christian Obrist (2)
2003: Christian Obrist (3)
2004: Christian Obrist (4)
2005: Christian Obrist (5)
2006: Christian Obrist (6)
2007: Christian Obrist (7)
2008: Lukas Rifesser
2009: Mario Scapini
2010: Giulio Iannone
2011: Merihun Crespi
2012: Christian Obrist (8)
2013: Merihun Crespi (2)
2014: Mohad Abdikadar Sheik

2016: Yemaneberhan Crippa
2017: Joao Bussotti 
2018: Joao Bussotti 
2019: Matteo Spanu  
2020: Joao Bussotti 
2021: Mohamed Zerrad
2022: Ossama Meslek

5000 metres

1907: Dorando Pietri
1908: Pericle Pagliani
1909: Ezio Cappellini
1910: Giuseppe Cattro
1911: Alfonso Orlando
1912: Alfonso Orlando (2)
1913: Oreste Luppi
1914: Primo Brega
1915–1918: not held
1919: Primo Brega (2)
1920: Carlo Speroni
1921: Carlo Speroni (2)
1922: Ernesto Ambrosini
1923: Ernesto Ambrosini (2)
1924: Angelo Davoli
1925: Giovanni Busan
1926: Angelo Davoli (2)
1927: Luigi Boero
1928: Luigi Boero (2)
1929: Luigi Boero (3)
1930: Nello Bartolini
1931: Corrado Franceschini
1932: Giuseppe Lippi
1933: Bruno Betti 
1934: Salvatore Mastroieni 
1935: Luigi Beccali 
1936: Umberto Cerati
1937: Luigi Pellin
1938: Giuseppe Beviacqua
1939: Giuseppe Beviacqua (2)
1940: Giuseppe Beviacqua (3)
1941: Giuseppe Beviacqua (4)
1942: Giuseppe Beviacqua (5)
1943: Giuseppe Beviacqua (6)
1944: not held
1945: Alfredo Lazzerini
1946: Giovanni Nocco 
1947: Giovanni Nocco (2)
1948: Giovanni Nocco (3)
1949: Mario Nocco
1950: Giovanni Nocco (4)
1951: Valentino Manzutti
1952: Giacomo Peppicelli
1953: Rino Lavelli 
1954: Giacomo Peppicelli (2)
1955: Francesco Perrone
1956: Francesco Perrone (2)
1957: Gianfranco Baraldi
1958: Antonio Ambu
1959: Luigi Conti
1960: Luigi Conti (2)
1961: Antonio Ambu (2)
1962: Antonio Ambu (3)
1963: Luigi Conti (3)
1964: Antonio Ambu (4)
1965: Antonio Ambu (5)
1966: Renzo Finelli
1967: Antonio Ambu (6)
1968: Giuseppe Ardizzone
1969: Renzo Finelli (2)
1970: Giuseppe Ardizzone (2)
1971: Franco Arese
1972: Aldo Tomasini
1973: Aldo Tomasini (2)
1974: Giuseppe Cindolo
1975: Giuseppe Cindolo (2)
1976: Giuseppe Gerbi
1977: Venanzio Ortis
1978: Piero Selvaggio
1979: Mariano Scartezzini
1980: Alberto Cova
1981: Piero Selvaggio (2)
1982: Alberto Cova (2)
1983: Alberto Cova (3)
1984: Stefano Mei
1985: Alberto Cova (4)
1986: Stefano Mei (2)
1987: Ranieri Carenza
1988: Francesco Panetta
1989: Stefano Mei (3)
1990: Renato Gotti
1991: Stefano Mei (4)
1992: Renato Gotti (2)
1993: Giuliano Baccani
1994: Angelo Carosi
1995: Francesco Bennici
1996: Umberto Pusterla
1997: Simone Zanon
1998: Angelo Carosi (2)
1999: Luciano Di Pardo
2000: Gennaro Di Napoli
2001: Salvatore Vincenti
2002: Salvatore Vincenti (2)
2003: Salvatore Vincenti (3)
2004: Michele Gamba
2005: Simone Zanon (2)
2006: Cosimo Caliandro
2007: Daniele Meucci
2008: Daniele Meucci (2)
2009: Stefano La Rosa
2010: Stefano La Rosa (2)
2011: Stefano La Rosa (3)
2012: Stefano La Rosa (4)
2013: Stefano La Rosa (5)
2014: Marouan Razine
2015: Marouan Razine (2)
2016: Yassine Rachik (3)
2017: Marco Najibe Salami 
2018: Marouan Razine (4)
2019: Marouan Razine (5)
2020: Ala Zoghlami
2021: Pietro Riva
2022: Yemaneberhan Crippa

10000 metres

1913: Carlo Martinenghi
1914: Carlo Speroni
1915–1918: not held
1919: Augusto Maccario
1920: Carlo Speroni (2)
1921: Carlo Speroni (3)
1922: Primo Brega
1923: Costante Lussana
1924: Carlo Speroni (4)
1925: Carlo Speroni (5)
1926: Francesco Mai
1927: Luigi Rossini
1928: Giuseppe Robino
1929: Giuseppe Robino (2)
1930: Giuseppe Robino (3)
1931: Angelo Malachina
1932: Spartaco Morelli
1933: Angelo Malachina (2)
1934: Spartaco Morelli (2)
1935: Giovanni Balbusso 
1936: Giuseppe Beviacqua
1937: Giuseppe Beviacqua (2)
1938: Giuseppe Lippi
1939: Giuseppe Lippi (2)
1940: Cristofano Sestini 
1941: Giovanni Cultrone
1942: Giuseppe Beviacqua (3)
1943: Giuseppe Beviacqua (4)
1944: not held
1945: Alfredo Lazzerini
1946: Giuseppe Beviacqua (5)
1947: Giuseppe Beviacqua (6)
1948: Giuseppe Beviacqua (7)
1949: Pietro Balistreri
1950: Cristofano Sestini (2)
1951: Giacomo Peppicelli
1952: Giacomo Peppicelli (2)
1953: Giacomo Peppicelli (3)
1954: Giambattista Martini 
1955: Giuseppe Lavelli
1956: Franco Volpi
1957: Francesco Perrone
1958: Antonio Ambu
1959: Franco Volpi (2)
1960: Luigi Conti
1961: Franco Antonelli
1962: Antonio Ambu (2)
1963: Luigi Conti (2)
1964: Antonio Ambu (3)
1965: Antonio Ambu (4)
1966: Antonio Ambu (5)
1967: Antonio Ambu (6)
1968: Antonio Ambu (7)
1969: Giuseppe Cindolo
1970: Giuseppe Cindolo (2)
1971: Giuseppe Cindolo (3)
1972: Giuseppe Cindolo (4)
1973: Giuseppe Cindolo (5)
1974: Giuseppe Cindolo (6)
1975: Giuseppe Cindolo (7)
1976: Venanzio Ortis
1977: Luigi Zarcone
1978: Venanzio Ortis (2)
1979: Luigi Zarcone (2)
1980: Claudio Solone
1981: Alberto Cova
1982: Alberto Cova (2)
1983: Loris Pimazzoni
1984: Gianni Demadonna
1985: Salvatore Nicosia
1986: Francesco Panetta
1987: Giuseppe Miccoli
1988: Giuseppe Miccoli (2)
1989: Massimo Santamaria
1990: Graziano Calvaresi
1991: Vincenzo Modica
1992: Paolo Donati
1993: Stefano Baldini
1994: Stefano Baldini (2)
1995: Stefano Baldini (3)
1996: Stefano Baldini (4)
1997: Rachid Berradi
1998: Danilo Goffi
1999: Vincenzo Modica (2)
2000: Daniele Caimmi
2001: Stefano Baldini (5)
2002: Stefano Baldini (6)
2003: Marco Bartoletti
2004: Marco Mazza
2005: Giuliano Battocletti
2006: Daniele Meucci
2007: Daniele Meucci (2)
2008: Stefano La Rosa
2009: Stefano La Rosa (2)
2010: Daniele Meucci (3)
2011: Domenico Ricatti
2012: Simone Gariboldi
2013: Jamel Chatbi
2014: Domenico Ricatti (2)
2015: Said El Otmani 
2016: Ahmed El Mazoury
2017: Ahmed El Mazoury (2)
2018: Stefano La Rosa (3)
2019: Lorenzo Dini
2020: Osama Zoghlami
2021: Iliass Aouani
2022: Pietro Riva

110 m hurdles

1907: Andrea Pinzi-Reynaud
1908: Alfredo Pagani
1909: Ezio Massa
1910: Emilio Brambilla
1911: Daclamo Colbachini
1912: Daclamo Colbachini (2)
1913: Giovanni Villa
1914: Giovanni Villa (2)
1915–1918: not held
1919: Daclamo Colbachini (3)
1920: Daclamo Colbachini (4)
1921: Adolfo Contoli
1922: Adolfo Contoli (2)
1923: Adolfo Contoli (3)
1924: Adolfo Contoli (4)
1925: Goffredo Alessandrini
1926: Adolfo Contoli (5)
1927: Giacomo Carlini
1928: Giacomo Carlini (2)
1929: Giacomo Carlini (3)
1930: Luigi Facelli
1931: Luigi Facelli (2)
1932: Corrado Valle
1933: Corrado Valle (2)
1934: Corrado Valle (3)
1935: Gianni Caldana
1936: Gianni Caldana (2)
1937: Gianni Caldana (3)
1938: Gianni Caldana (4)
1939: Giorgio Oberweger
1940: Gianni Caldana (5)
1941: Aristide Facchini
1942: Giulio Dentis
1943: Aristide Facchini (2)
1944: not held
1945: Albano Albanese
1946: Arnaldo Balestra
1947: Arnaldo Balestra (2)
1948: Albano Albanese (2)
1949: Albano Albanese (3)
1950: Albano Albanese (4)
1951: Albano Albanese (5)
1952: Albano Albanese (6)
1953: Ezio Nardelli
1954: Ezio Nardelli (2)
1955: Giampiero Massardi
1956: Giampiero Massardi (2)
1957: Giorgio Mazza
1958: Giorgio Mazza (2)
1959: Nereo Svara
1960: Giovanni Cornacchia
1961: Nereo Svara (2)
1962: Giovanni Cornacchia (2)
1963: Giorgio Mazza (3)
1964: Giovanni Cornacchia (3)
1965: Eddy Ottoz
1966: Eddy Ottoz (2)
1967: Eddy Ottoz (3)
1968: Eddy Ottoz (4)
1969: Eddy Ottoz (5)
1970: Sergio Liani
1971: Sergio Liani (2)
1972: Giuseppe Buttari
1973: Sergio Liani (3)
1974: Giuseppe Buttari (2)
1975: Giuseppe Buttari (3)
1976: Giuseppe Buttari (4)
1977: Sergio Liani
1978: Giuseppe Buttari (5)
1979: Giuseppe Buttari (6)
1980: Gianni Ronconi
1981: Daniele Fontecchio
1982: Daniele Fontecchio (2)
1983: Daniele Fontecchio (3)
1984: Daniele Fontecchio (4)
1985: Daniele Fontecchio (5)
1986: Daniele Fontecchio (6)
1987: Gianni Tozzi
1988: Gianni Tozzi (2)
1989: Fausto Frigerio
1990: Laurent Ottoz
1991: Laurent Ottoz (2)
1992: Laurent Ottoz (3)
1993: Fausto Frigerio (2)
1994: Laurent Ottoz (4)
1995: Mauro Re
1996: Mauro Rossi
1997: Mauro Rossi (2)
1998: Mauro Rossi (3)
1999: Andrea Giaconi
2000: Emiliano Pizzoli
2001: Emiliano Pizzoli (2)
2002: Emiliano Pizzoli (3)
2003: Emiliano Pizzoli (4)
2004: Emiliano Pizzoli (5)
2005: Andrea Giaconi
2006: Andrea Giaconi (2)
2007: Emanuele Abate
2008: Emanuele Abate (2)
2009: Stefano Tedesco
2010: Stefano Tedesco (2)
2011: Emanuele Abate (3)
2012: Paolo Dal Molin
2013: Hassane Fofana
2014: Hassane Fofana (2)
2015: Hassane Fofana (3)
2016: Hassane Fofana (4)
2017: Lorenzo Perini 
2018: Lorenzo Perini (2)
2019: Hassane Fofana (5)
2020: Lorenzo Perini (3)
2021: Paolo Dal Molin (2)
2022: Hassane Fofana (6)

400 m hurdles

1913: Emilio Lunghi
1914: Giuseppe Bernardoni
1915–1918: not held
1919: Angelo Vigani
1920: Adolfo Contoli
1921: Adolfo Contoli (2)
1922: Fortunato Braccini
1923: Carlo Scapin
1924: Luigi Facelli 
1925: Luigi Facelli (2)
1926: Luigi Facelli (3) 
1927: Luigi Facelli (4) 
1928: Luigi Facelli (5) 
1929: Luigi Facelli (6) 
1930: Luigi Facelli (7) 
1931: Luigi Facelli (8) 
1932: Giordano Cumar
1933: Emilio Mori
1934: Mario Radaelli
1935: Luigi Facelli (9) 
1936: Luigi Facelli (10) 
1937: Emilio Mori (2)
1938: Luigi Facelli (11) 
1939: Angelo Lualdi
1940: Giuseppe Pantone
1941: Ottavio Missoni
1942: Armando Filiput
1943: Guerino Colautti
1944: not held
1945: Luigi Paterlini
1946: Armando Filiput (2)
1947: Ottavio Missoni (2)
1948: Ottavio Missoni (3)
1949: Armando Filiput (3)
1950: Armando Filiput (4)
1951: Armando Filiput (5)
1952: Armando Filiput (6)
1953: Armando Filiput (7)
1954: Armando Filiput (8)
1955: Moreno Martini
1956: Franco Bettella
1957: Salvatore Morale
1958: Salvatore Morale (2)
1959: Moreno Martini (2)
1960: Salvatore Morale (3)
1961: Salvatore Morale (4)
1962: Luigi Carrozza
1963: Roberto Frinolli
1964: Roberto Frinolli (2)
1965: Roberto Frinolli (3)
1966: Roberto Frinolli (4)
1967: Alessandro Scatena
1968: Roberto Frinolli (5)
1969: Roberto Frinolli (6)
1970: Sergio Bello
1971: Giorgio Ballati
1972: Giorgio Ballati (2)
1973: Daniele Giovanardi
1974: Giorgio Ballati (3)
1975: Giorgio Ballati (4)
1976: Franco Mazzetti
1977: Lorenzo Brigante
1978: Giorgio Ballati (5)
1979: Fulvio Zorn
1980: Giorgio Ballati (6)
1981: Fulvio Zorn (2)
1982: Saverio Gellini
1983: Luca Cosi
1984: Stefano Bizzaglia
1985: Luca Cosi (2)
1986: Luca Cosi (3)
1987: Angelo Locci
1988: Luca Cosi (4)
1989: Fabrizio Mori
1990: Mauro Maurizi
1991: Fabrizio Mori (2)
1992: Enzo Franciosi
1993: Giorgio Frinolli
1994: Giorgio Frinolli (2)
1995: Laurent Ottoz
1996: Fabrizio Mori (3)
1997: Laurent Ottoz (2)
1998: Laurent Ottoz (3)
1999: Laurent Ottoz (4)
2000: Giorgio Frinolli (3)
2001: Laurent Ottoz (5)
2002: Laurent Ottoz (6)
2003: Gianni Carabelli
2004: Gianni Carabelli (2)
2005: Gianni Carabelli (3)
2006: Gianni Carabelli (4)
2007: Claudio Citterio
2008: Nicola Cascella
2009: Nicola Cascella (2)
2010: Giacomo Panizza
2011: José Bencosme
2012: José Bencosme (2)
2013: Eusebio Haliti
2014: Leonardo Capotosti
2015: Leonardo Capotosti (2)
2016: José Bencosme (3)
2017: Lorenzo Vergani 
2018: José Bencosme (4)
2019: Alessandro Sibilio
2020: Mario Lambrughi
2021: Alessandro Sibilio (2)
2022: Mario Lambrughi (2)

3000 m steeplechase

1923: Ernesto Ambrosini
1924: Antenore Negri 
1925: Antenore Negri (2)
1926: Nello Bartolini
1927: Nello Bartolini (2) 
1928: Angelo Davoli
1929: Giuseppe Venturi
1930: Angelo Davoli (2)
1931: Nello Bartolini (3)
1932: Nello Bartolini (4)
1933: Giuseppe Lippi
1934: Nello Bartolini (5)
1935: Giuseppe Lippi (2)
1936: Giuseppe Lippi (3)
1937: Ilario Ugolini
1938: Ferdinando Migliaccio
1939: Candido Parodi
1940: Giuseppe Lippi (4)
1941: Giovanni Cultrone
1942: Carlo Bertocchi
1943–1945: not held
1946: Renato Colosio
1947: Ilario Ugolini (2)
1948: Giuseppe Lippi (5)

1950: Ilario Zanatta
1951: Vittorio Maggioni
1952: Vittorio Maggioni (2)
1953: Ivo Palleri
1954: Vittorio Maggioni (3)
1955: Valentino Manzutti
1956: Vincenzo Leone
1957: Vincenzo Leone (2)
1958: Alfredo Rizzo
1959: Onofrio Costa
1960: Enzo Volpi
1961: Gianfranco Sommaggio
1962: Gianfranco Sommaggio (2)
1963: Alfredo Rizzo (2)
1964: Alfredo Rizzo (3)
1965: Massimo Begnis
1966: Massimo Begnis (2)
1967: Giovanni Pizzi
1968: Brunello Bertolin
1969: Umberto Risi
1970: Umberto Risi (2)
1971: Francesco Valenti
1972: Franco Fava
1973: Franco Fava (2)
1974: Franco Fava (3)
1975: Franco Fava (4)
1976: Roberto Volpi
1977: Roberto Volpi (2)
1978: Roberto Volpi (3)
1979: Mariano Scartezzini
1980: Roberto Volpi (4)
1981: Mariano Scartezzini (2)
1982: Luciano Carchesio
1983: Mariano Scartezzini (3)
1984: Franco Boffi
1985: Francesco Panetta
1986: A. Lambruschini
1987: A. Lambruschini (2)
1988: Francesco Panetta (2)
1989: Angelo Carosi
1990: A. Lambruschini (3)
1991: Angelo Carosi (2)
1992: A. Lambruschini (4)
1993: Gianni Crepaldi
1994: A. Lambruschini (5)
1995: Alessandro Briana
1996: A. Lambruschini (6)
1997: Daniele Banchini
1998: Angelo Iannelli
1999: Stefano Ciallella
2000: Luciano Di Pardo
2001: Giuseppe Maffei
2002: Angelo Iannelli (2)
2003: Angelo Iannelli (3)
2004: Angelo Carosi (3)
2005: Yuri Floriani
2006: Angelo Iannelli (4)
2007: Yuri Floriani (2)
2008: Yuri Floriani (3)
2009: Matteo Villani
2010: Yuri Floriani (4)
2011: Yuri Floriani (5)
2012: Matteo Villani (2)
2013: Jamel Chatbi
2014: Patrick Nasti
2015: Jamel Chatbi (2)
2016: Yuri Floriani (6) 
2017: Ala Zoghlami 
2018: Leonardo Feletto
2019: Ahmed Abdelwahed
2020: Ala Zoghlami (2)
2021: Ala Zoghlami (3)
2022: Leonardo Feletto (2)

10000 m walk
The 10,000 m walk on track ran until 2011. Since 2012 the race has been replaced with the 10 km walk on road.

1907: Arturo Balestrieri
1908: Angelo Claro
1909: Pietro Fontana
1910: Fernando Altimani
1911: Fernando Altimani (2)
1912: Fernando Altimani (3)
1913: Fernando Altimani (4)
1914: Giovanni Galli
1915–1918: not held
1919: Ugo Frigerio
1920: Ugo Frigerio (2)
1921: Ugo Frigerio (3)
1922: Armando Valente
1923: Ugo Frigerio (4)
1924: Ugo Frigerio (5)
1925: Ettore Gariboldi
1926: Armando Valente (2)
1927: Armando Valente (3)
1928: Armando Valente (4)
1929: Armando Valente (5)
1930: not held
1931: Ugo Frigerio (6)
1932–1936: not held
1937: Giovanni Andreini
1938: Luigi Peri
1939: Giuseppe Kressevich
1940: Giuseppe Kressevich (2)
1941: Giuseppe Kressevich (3)
1942: Giuseppe Kressevich (4)
1943: Giuseppe Kressevich (5)
1944: not held
1945: Giuseppe Kressevich (6)
1946: Pino Dordoni
1947: Pino Dordoni (2)
1948: Pino Dordoni (3)
1949: Pino Dordoni (4)
1950: Pino Dordoni (5)
1951: Pino Dordoni (6)
1952: Pino Dordoni (7)
1953: Pino Dordoni (8)
1954: Pino Dordoni (9)
1955: Pino Dordoni (10)
1956: Abdon Pamich
1957: Pino Dordoni (11)
1958: Abdon Pamich (2)
1959: Abdon Pamich (3)
1960: Abdon Pamich (4)
1961: Abdon Pamich (5)
1962: Abdon Pamich (6)
1963: Abdon Pamich (7)
1964: Abdon Pamich (8)
1965: Abdon Pamich (9)
1966: Abdon Pamich (10)
1967: Abdon Pamich (11)
1968: Abdon Pamich (12)
1969: Abdon Pamich (13)
1970–1978:  not held
1979: Maurizio Damilano
1980: Carlo Mattioli
1981: Maurizio Damilano
1982: Maurizio Damilano (2)
1983: Maurizio Damilano (3)
1984: Maurizio Damilano (4)
1985: Maurizio Damilano (5)
1986: Carlo Mattioli (2)
1987: Maurizio Damilano (6)
1988: Giovanni De Benedictis
1989: G. De Benedictis (2)
1990: G. De Benedictis (3)
1991: G. De Benedictis (4)
1992: G. De Benedictis (5)
1993: G. De Benedictis (6)
1994: Michele Didoni
1995: G. De Benedictis (7)
1996: Michele Didoni (2)
1997: G. De Benedictis (8)
1998: Michele Didoni (3)
1999: Ivano Brugnetti
2000: Marco Giungi
2001: Michele Didoni (4)
2002: G. De Benedictis (9)
2003: Andrea Manfredini
2004: Lorenzo Civallero
2005: Enrico Lang
2006: Ivano Brugnetti (2)
2007: Alex Schwazer
2008: Ivano Brugnetti (3)
2009: Ivano Brugnetti (4)
2010: Alex Schwazer (2)
2011: Jean J. Nkouloukidi

Road

10 km road

2010: Stefano Baldini
2011: Stefano Scaini
2012: Domenico Ricatti
2013: Mohamed Laqouahi
2014: Andrea Lalli
2105: Manuel Cominotto
2016: Marouan Razine
2017: Yassine Rachik
2018: Marco Salami
2019: Lorenzo Dini
2020: Not disputed
2021: Iliass Aouani

Half marathon

1897: Cesare Ferrari
1898: Ettore Zilia
1899: Ettore Zilia (2)
1900: Francesco Stobbone
1901: Giacomo Volpati
1902: Ettore Ferri
1903: Giacomo Volpati (2)
1904: not held
1905: Dorando Pietri
1906: Pericle Pagliani
1907: Dorando Pietri (2)
1908: Dorando Pietri (3)
1909: Armando Pagliani 
1910: Pericle Pagliani (2)
1911: Adolfo Testoni
1912: Carlo Speroni
1913: Carlo Speroni (2)
1914: Carlo Speroni (3)
1915–1918: not held
1919: Ettore Blasi
1920: Ettore Blasi (2)
1921: Ettore Blasi (3)
1922: Ettore Blasi (4)
1923–1924: not held
1925: Vincenzo D'Amore
1926: Stefano Natale
1927: Luigi Rossini
1928: Giovanni Balbusso
1929: Luigi Rossini (2)
1930: Luigi Rossini (3)
1931: Spartaco Morelli
1932: Simone Paduano
1933–1936: not held
1937: Giovanni Balbusso (2)
1938: Umberto De Florentiis
1939: Savino Resia
1940: Savino Resia (2)
1941: Salvatore Costantino
1942: Ettore Padovani
1943: Salvatore Costantino (2)
1944: Romano Maffeis
1945: Romano Maffeis (2)
1946: Antonio Carta 
1947: Salvatore Costantino (2)
1948: Pietro Balistrieri
1949: Pietro Balistrieri (2)
1950: Asfò Bussotti
1951: Egilberto Martufi
1952: Asfò Bussotti (2)
1953: Giacomo Peppicelli (2)
1954: Agostino Conti
1955: Edoardo Righi
1956: Rino Lavelli
1957: Giacomo Peppicelli (2)
1958: Silvio De Florentiis
1959: Silvio De Florentiis (2)
1960: Silvio De Florentiis (3)
1961: Antonio Ambu
1962: Antonio Ambu (2)
1963: Silvio De Florentiis (2)
1964: Antonio Ambu (3)
1965: Antonio Ambu (4)
1966: Antonio Ambu (5)
1967: Antonio Ambu (6)
1968: Antonio Ambu (7)
1969: Gioacchino De Palma
1970: Gioacchino De Palma (2)
1971: Francesco Amante
1972: Renato Martini
1973: Italo Tentorini
1974: Giuseppe Cindolo
1975: Paolo Accaputo
1976: Franco Fava
1977: Paolo Accaputo (2)
1978: Massimo Magnani
1979: Gianpaolo Messina
1980: Paolo Accaputo (3)
1981: Massimo Magnani (2)
1982: Alessandro Rastello
1983: Vito Basiliana
1984: Vito Basiliana (2)
1985: Loris Pimazzoni
1986: Salvatore Bettiol
1987: Davide Bergamini
1988: Salvatore Bettiol (2)
1989: Walter D'Urbano
1990: Gelindo Bordin
1991: Raffaello Alliegro
1992: Vincenzo Modica
1993: Vincenzo Modica (2)
1994: Vincenzo Modica (3)
1995: Stefano Baldini
1996: Danilo Goffi
1997: Francesco Ingargiola
1998: Stefano Baldini (2)
1999: Daniele Caimmi
2000: Rachid Berradi
2001: Stefano Baldini (3)
2002: Giuliano Battocletti
2003: Michele Gamba
2004: Stefano Baldini (4)
2005: Fabio Mascheroni
2006: Stefano Baldini (5)
2007: Giuliano Battocletti (2)
2008: Federico Simionato
2009: Stefano Baldini (6)
2010: Ruggero Pertile
2011: Francesco Bona
2012: Stefano La Rosa
2013: Gianmarco Buttazzo
2014: Daniele Meucci
2015: Andrea Lalli
2016: Daniele D'Onofrio
2017: Yassine Rachik
2018: Ahmed El Mazoury
2019: Nekagenet Crippa
2020: Daniele D'Onofrio
2021: Iliass Aouani
2022: Yohanes Chiappinelli

Marathon

1908: Umberto Blasi
1909: Umberto Blasi (2)
1910: Antonio Fraschini
1911: Orlando Cesaroni
1912: Giovanni Beltrandi
1913: Fernando Altimani (4)
1914: Angelo Malvicini
1915–1918: not held
1919: Valerio Arri
1920: Florestano Benedetti
1921: Florestano Benedetti (2)
1922: Angelo Malvicini (2)
1923: Ettore Blasi
1924: Romeo Bertini
1925: Attilio Conton
1926: Stefano Natale
1927: Luigi Rossini
1928: Luigi Prato
1929: Stefano Natale (2)
1930: Stefano Natale (3)
1931: Francesco Roccati
1932: Michele Fanelli
1933: Aurelio Genghini
1934: Michele Fanelli (2)
1935: Luigi Rossini (2)
1936: Giovanni Bulzone
1937: Aurelio Genghini (2)
1938: Francesco Raccati
1939: Francesco Raccati (2)
1940: Salvatore Costantino
1941: Romano Maffeis
1942: Francesco Raccati (3)
1943–1944: not held
1945: Ettore Padovani
1946: Stefano Natale (4)
1947: Salvatore Costantino (2)
1948: Renato Braghini
1949: Cristofano Sestini
1950: Gaetano Marzano
1951: Asfò Bussotti
1952: Egilberto Martufi
1953: Antonio Sabelli 
1954: Antidoro Berti
1955: Antidoro Berti (2)
1956: Rino Lavelli
1957: Rino Lavelli (2)
1958: Francesco Perrone
1959: Enrico Massante
1960: Rino Lavelli
1961: Francesco Perrone (2)
1962: Antonio Ambu
1963: Giorgio Jegmer
1964: Antonio Ambu (2)
1965: Antonio Ambu (3)
1966: Antonio Ambu (4)
1967: Antonio Ambu (5)
1968: Antonio Ambu (6)
1969: Antonio Ambu (7)
1970: Toni Ritsch
1971: Giovanbattista Bassi
1972: Francesco Amante
1973: Paolo Accaputo
1974: Giuseppe Cindolo
1975: Giuseppe Cindolo (2)
1976: Giuseppe Cindolo (3)
1977: Paolo Accaputo (2)
1978: Massimo Magnani
1979: Michelangelo Arena
1980: Michelangelo Arena (2)
1981: Giampaolo Messina
1982: Giuseppe Gerbi
1983: Giuseppe Gerbi (2)
1984: Gianni Poli
1985: Osvaldo Faustini
1986: Osvaldo Faustini (2)
1987: Salvatore Bettiol
1988: Carlo Terzer
1989: Marco Milani
1990: Severino Bernardini
1991: Salvatore Bettiol (2)
1992: Giacomo Tagliaferri
1993: Walter D'Urbano
1994: Salvatore Nicosia
1995: Danilo Goffi
1996: Franco Togni
1997: Massimiliano Ingrami
1998: Migidio Bourifa
1999: Roberto Barbi
2000: Roberto Barbi (2)
2001: Angelo Carosi
2002: Fabio Rinaldi
2003: Angelo Carosi (2)
2004: Roberto Barbi (3)
2005: Vincenzo Modica
2006: Ruggero Pertile
2007: Migidio Bourifa (2)
2008: Alberico Di Cecco
2009: Migidio Bourifa (3)
2010: Migidio Bourifa (4)
2011: Giovanni Gualdi
2012: Migidio Bourifa (5)
2013: Ruggero Pertile (2)
2014: Danilo Goffi (2)
2015: Dario Santoro
2016: Ahmed Nasef
2017: Ahmed Nasef
2018: Alessio Terrasi
2019: René Cunéaz
2020: Giovanni Grano
2021: Antonino Lollo

10 km walk
The 10 km walk on road has been held since 2012, previously the race was run on 10,000 m walk on track.
2012: Giorgio Rubino
2013: Matteo Giupponi
2014: Giorgio Rubino
2015: Federico Tontodonati
2016: Francesco Fortunato
2017: Federico Tontodonati (2)
2018: Massimo Stano
2019: Gianluca Picchiottino
2020: Francesco Fortunato (2)
2021: Francesco Fortunato (3)

20 km walk

1947: Pino Dordoni
1948: Pino Dordoni (2)
1949: Pino Dordoni (3)
1950: Pino Dordoni (4)
1951: Salvatore Cascino
1952: Pino Dordoni (5)
1953: Pino Dordoni (6)
1954: Pino Dordoni (7)
1955: Pino Dordoni (8)
1956: Pino Dordoni (9)
1957: Pino Dordoni (10)
1958: Abdon Pamich
1959: Abdon Pamich (2)
1960: Abdon Pamich (3)
1961: Abdon Pamich (4)
1962: Abdon Pamich (5)
1963: Abdon Pamich (6)
1964: Abdon Pamich (7)
1965: Abdon Pamich (8)
1966: Abdon Pamich (9)
1967: Abdon Pamich (10)
1968: Abdon Pamich (11)
1969: Abdon Pamich (12)
1970: Vittorio Visini
1971: Abdon Pamich (13)
1972: Armando Zambaldo
1973: Armando Zambaldo (2)
1974: Armando Zambaldo (3)
1975: Armando Zambaldo (4)
1976: Vittorio Canini
1977: Roberto Buccione
1978: Maurizio Damilano
1979: Giorgio Damilano
1980: Maurizio Damilano (2)
1981: Maurizio Damilano (3)
1982: Maurizio Damilano (4)
1983: Maurizio Damilano (5)
1984: Maurizio Damilano (6)
1985: Maurizio Damilano (7)
1986: Maurizio Damilano (8)
1987: Carlo Mattioli
1988: Maurizio Damilano (9)
1989: Giovanni De Benedictis
1990: Giovanni De Benedictis (2)
1991: Giovanni De Benedictis (3)
1992: Maurizio Damilano (10)
1993: Giovanni De Benedictis (4)
1994: Giuseppe De Gaetano
1995: Michele Didoni
1996: Giovanni De Benedictis (5)
1997: Giovanni De Benedictis (6)
1998: Marco Giungi
1999: Giovanni De Benedictis (7)
2000: Marco Giungi (2)
2001: Giovanni De Benedictis (8)
2002: Marco Giungi (3)
2003: Ivano Brugnetti
2004: Ivano Brugnetti (2)
2005: Giorgio Rubino
2006: Fortunato D'Onofrio
2007: Alex Schwazer
2008: Alex Schwazer (2)
2009: Jean Jacques Nkouloukidi
2010: Jean Jacques Nkouloukidi (2)
2011: Marco De Luca
2012: Federico Tontodonati
2013: Vito Di Bari
2014: Giorgio Rubino
2015: Massimo Stano
2016: Federico Tontodonati (2)
2017: Francesco Fortunato
2018: Massimo Stano (2)
2019: Gianluca Picchiottino
2020: not diputed due Covid
2021: Federico Tontodonati (3)
2022: Massimo Stano (3)

50 km walk

1908: Antonio Navoni
1909: Silla Del Sole
1910: Italo Berta
1911: not held
1912: Donato Pavesi
1913: Giovanni Brunelli
1914: Donato Pavesi (2)
1915–1918: not held
1919: Giusto Umeck
1920: Giusto Umeck (2)
1921: Donato Pavesi (3)
1922: Giovanni Brunelli (2)
1923: Giovanni Brunelli (3)
1924: Donato Pavesi (4)
1925: Donato Pavesi (5)
1926: Attilio Callegari
1927: Giusto Umeck (3)
1928: Romano Vecchietti
1929: Romano Peggiolini
1930: Francesco Pretti
1931: Ettore Rivolta
1932: Umberto Olivoni
1933: Umberto Olivoni (2)
1934: Ettore Rivolta (2)
1935: Ettore Rivolta (3)
1936: Ettore Rivolta (4)
1937: Giuseppe Gobbato
1938: Cosimo Puttilli
1939: Ettore Rivolta (5)
1940: Alighiero Guglielmi
1941: Giuseppe Malaspina
1942: Alighiero Guglielmi (2)
1943–1944: not held
1945: Giuseppe Kressevich (6)
1946: Valentino Bertolini
1947: Cosimo Puttilli (2)
1948: Valentino Bertolini (2)
1949: Pino Dordoni
1950: Pino Dordoni (2)
1951: Salvatore Cascino
1952: Pino Dordoni (3)
1953: Pino Dordoni (4)
1954: Pino Dordoni (5)
1955: Abdon Pamich
1956: Abdon Pamich (2)
1957: Abdon Pamich (3)
1958: Abdon Pamich (4)
1959: Abdon Pamich (5)
1960: Abdon Pamich (6)
1961: Abdon Pamich (7)
1962: Abdon Pamich (8)
1963: Abdon Pamich (9)
1964: Abdon Pamich (10)
1965: Abdon Pamich (11)
1966: Abdon Pamich (12)
1967: Abdon Pamich (13)
1968: Abdon Pamich (14)
1969: Sante Mancini
1970: Vittorio Visini
1971: Vittorio Visini (2)
1972: Vittorio Visini (3)
1973: Vittorio Visini (4)
1974: Vittorio Visini (5)
1975: Vittorio Visini (6)
1976: Paolo Grecucci
1977: Franco Vecchio
1978: Paolo Grecucci (2)
1979: Domenico Carpentieri
1980: Domenico Carpentieri
1981: Vittorio Visini (7)
1982: Graziano Morotti
1983: Raffaello Ducceschi
1984: Raffaello Ducceschi (2)
1985: Maurizio Damilano
1986: Maurizio Damilano (2)
1987: Giovanni Perricelli
1988: Raffaello Ducceschi (3)
1989: Giovanni Perricelli (2)
1990: Maurizio Damilano (3)
1991: Giovanni Perricelli (3)
1992: Giovanni Perricelli (4)
1993: Giuseppe De Gaetano
1994: Giovanni De Benedictis
1995: Alessandro Mistretta
1996: G. De Benedictis (2)
1997: Giovanni Perricelli (5)
1998: Michele Didoni
1999: Marco Giungi
2000: Francesco Galdenzi
2001: Marco Giungi (2)
2002: Marco Giungi (3)
2003: Marco Giungi (4)
2004: Marco Giungi (5)
2005: Alex Schwazer
2006: Marco De Luca
2007: Alex Schwazer (2)
2008: Alex Schwazer (3)
2009: Marco De Luca (2)
2010: Alex Schwazer (4)
2011: Federico Tontodonati
2012: Federico Tontodonati (2)
2013: not held
2014: Matteo Giupponi
2015: Federico Tontodonati (3)
2016: Michele Antonelli
2017: Stefano Chiesa
2018: Leonardo Dei Tos
2019: Michele Antonelli (2)
2020: not diputed due Covid
2021: Teodorico Caporaso

Field

Long jump

1913: Antonio Garimoldi
1914: Oreste Zaccagna
1915/1918: not held
1919: Arturo Nespoli
1920: Adolfo Contoli
1921: Ottorino Aloisio
1922: Adolfo Contoli
1923: Arturo Nespoli
1924: Virgilio Tommasi
1925: Virgilio Tommasi
1926: Virgilio Tommasi
1927: Enrico Torre
1928: Virgilio Tommasi
1929: Virgilio Tommasi
1930: Arturo Maffei
1931: Virgilio Tommasi
1932: Arturo Maffei
1933: Francesco Tabai
1934: Francesco Tabai
1935: Arturo Maffei
1936: Arturo Maffei
1937: Arturo Maffei
1938: Arturo Maffei
1939: Arturo Maffei
1940: Arturo Maffei
1941: Fulvio Pellarini
1942: Gino Pederzani
1943: Aldo Vallon
1944: not held
1945: Aldo Vallon
1946: Alessandro Acerbi
1947: Lorenzo Toso
1948: Ugo Ardizzone
1949: Ugo Ardizzone
1950: Ugo Ardizzone
1951: Mario Naj Oleari
1952: Attilio Bravi
1953: Gianpiero Druetto
1954: Attilio Bravi
1955: Attilio Bravi
1956: Attilio Bravi and Valerio Colatore
1957: Attilio Bravi
1958: Attilio Bravi
1959: Attilio Bravi
1960: Attilio Bravi
1961: Raffaele Piras
1962: Giorgio Bortolozzi
1963: Raffaele Piras
1964: Giorgio Bortolozzi
1965: Marco Fornaciari
1966: Pierluigi Gatti
1967: Pasquale Santoro
1968: Giuseppe Gentile
1969: Carlo Arrighi
1970: Domenico Fontanella
1971: Ildebrando Fozzi
1972: Claudio Hernandez
1973: Carlo Molinaris
1974: Carlo Molinaris
1975: Domenico Fontanella
1976: Roberto Veglia
1977: Maurizio Siega
1978: Maurizio Maffi
1979: Maurizio Siega
1980: Maurizio Maffi
1981: Giovanni Evangelisti
1982: Giovanni Evangelisti
1983: Marco Piochi
1984: Claudio Cherubini
1985: Claudio Cherubini
1986: Giovanni Evangelisti
1987: Giuseppe Bertozzi
1988: Milko Campus
1989: Milko Campus
1990: Giuseppe Bertozzi
1991: Fausto Frigerio
1992: Giovanni Evangelisti
1993: Simone Bianchi
1994: Milko Campus
1995: Milko Campus
1996: Simone Bianchi
1997: Diego Boschiero
1998: Simone Bianchi
1999: Roberto Coltri
2000: Bruno Frinolli
2001: Nicola Trentin
2002: Nicola Trentin
2003: Nicola Trentin
2004: Stefano Dacastello
2005: Stefano Dacastello
2006: Ferdinando Iucolano
2007: Andrew Howe
2008: Stefano Tremigliozzi
2009: Alessio Guarini
2010: Andrew Howe
2011: Stefano Dacastello
2012: Fabrizio Schembri
2013: Alessio Guarini 
2014: Emanuele Catania
2015: Filippo Randazzo
2016: Marcell Jacobs
2017: Filippo Randazzo
2018: Filippo Randazzo
2019: Filippo Randazzo
2021: Filippo Randazzo
2022: Elias Sagheddu

Triple jump

1913: Antonio Garimoldi
1914: Antonio Garimoldi
1915–1918: not held		
1919: Apollino Barelli
1920: Apollino Barelli
1921: Luigi De Micheli
1922: Luigi De Micheli
1923: Luigi Facelli
1924: Mario Trabucco
1925: Mario Trabucco
1926: Mario Trabucco
1927: Mario Trabucco
1928: Plinio Palmano
1929: Luigi Facelli
1930: Plinio Palmano
1931: Plinio Palmano
1932: Folco Guglielmi
1933: Folco Guglielmi
1934: Folco Guglielmi
1935: Giuseppe Pende
1936: Francesco Tabai
1937: Francesco Tabai
1938: Mario Taddia
1939: Mario Taddia
1940: Alessandro Bettaglio
1941: Fulvio Pellarini
1942: Giuseppe Cuccotti
1943: Piero Pieracci
1944: not held				
1945: Guido Cavaler
1946: Fulvio Pellarini
1947: Antonio Casarotti
1948: Ferdinando Sormani
1949: Enrico Tosi
1950: Ferdinando Simi
1951: Ferdinando Sormani
1952: Adriano Bertacca
1953: Alberto Guzzi
1954: Stefano Bonsignore
1955: Antonio Trogu
1956: Ennio Evangelio
1957: Pierluigi Gatti
1958: Enzo Cavalli
1959: Enzo Cavalli
1960: Pierluigi Gatti
1961: Enzo Cavalli
1962: Enzo Cavalli
1963: Rinaldo Camaioni
1964: Pierluigi Gatti
1965: Giuseppe Gentile
1966: Giuseppe Gentile
1967: Pierluigi Gatti
1968: Giuseppe Gentile
1969: Rinaldo Camaioni
1970: Giuseppe Gentile
1971: Giuseppe Gentile
1972: Ezio Buzzelli
1973: Claudio Moretti
1974: Ezio Buzzelli
1975: Ruggero Consorte
1976: Paolo Piapan
1977: Roberto Mazzucato
1978: Paolo Piapan
1979: Roberto Mazzucato
1980: Alessandro Ussi
1981: Paolo Piapan
1982: Roberto Mazzucato
1983: Dario Badinelli
1984: Dario Badinelli
1985: Dario Badinelli
1986: Dario Badinelli
1987: Dario Badinelli
1988: Dario Badinelli
1989: Dario Badinelli
1990: Dario Badinelli
1991: Dario Badinelli
1992: Dario Badinelli
1993: Andrea Matarazzo
1994: Maurizio Gifaldi
1995: Andrea Matarazzo
1996: Paolo Camossi
1997: Paolo Camossi
1998: Paolo Camossi
1999: Paolo Camossi
2000: Fabrizio Donato
2001: Paolo Camossi
2002: Salvatore Morello
2003: Paolo Camossi
2004: Fabrizio Donato
2005: Paolo Camossi
2006: Fabrizio Donato
2007: Fabrizio Donato
2008: Fabrizio Donato
2009: Fabrizio Schembri
2010: Fabrizio Donato
2011: Fabrizio Donato
2012: Daniele Greco
2013: Fabrizio Schembri
2014: Fabrizio Schembri
2015: Fabrizio Donato
2016: Daniele Cavazzani
2017: Daniele Cavazzani
2018: Fabrizio Schembri
2019: Samuele Cerro
2020: Andrea Dallavalle
2021: Tobia Bocchi
2022: Andrea Dallavalle

High jump

1913: Carlo Andreoli
1914: Carlo Andreoli 
1915–1918: not held
1919: Pierino Pisati
1920: Pierino Pisati (2)
1921: Carlo Ghiringhelli
1922: Carlo Ghiringhelli (2)
1923: Giuseppe Pagani
1924: Giuseppe Palmieri 
1925: Giuseppe Palmieri (2)
1926: Giuseppe Palmieri (3) 
1927: Giuseppe Palmieri (4) 
1928: Giuseppe Palmieri (5) 
1929: Pio Pacchioni
1930: Edgardo Degli Espositi
1931: Angelo Tommasi
1932: Angelo Tommasi (2)
1933: Angelo Tommasi (3)
1934: Renato Dotti
1935: Angelo Tommasi (4)
1936: Angelo Tommasi (5)
1937: Eugenio Gasti
1938: Renato Dotti (2)
1939: Franco Colombini
1940: Alfredo Campagner
1941: Alfredo Campagner (2)
1942: Alfredo Campagner (3)
1943: Alfredo Campagner (4)
1944: not held
1945: Alfredo Campagner (5)
1946: Alfredo Campagner (6)
1947: Alfredo Campagner (7)
1948: Ovidio Bernes
1949: Ovidio Bernes (2)
1950: Albano Albanese
1951: Alfredo Campagner (8)
1952: Carlo Marchisio
1953: Pierluigi Sara
1954: Gianmario Roveraro
1955: Gianmario Roveraro (2)
1956: Gianmario Roveraro (3)
1957: Gianpiero Cordovani
1958: Gianpiero Cordovani (2)
1959: Gianpiero Cordovani (3)
1960: Brunello Martini
1961: Walter Zamparelli
1962: Roberto Galli
1963: Roberto Galli (2)
1964: Vittoriano Drovandi
1965: Vittoriano Drovandi (2)
1966: Erminio Azzaro
1967: Vittoriano Drovandi (3)
1968: Gian Marco Schivo
1969: Erminio Azzaro (2)
1970: Erminio Azzaro (3)
1971: Erminio Azzaro (4)
1972: Gian Marco Schivo (2)
1973: Enzo Del Forno
1974: Enzo Del Forno (2)
1975: Enzo Del Forno (3)
1976: Lorenzo Bianchi
1977: Rodolfo Bergamo
1978: Rodolfo Bergamo (2)
1979: Massimo Di Giorgio
1980: Massimo Di Giorgio (2)
1981: Oscar Raise
1982: Massimo Di Giorgio (3)
1983: Gianni Davito
1984: Paolo Borghi
1985: Luca Toso
1986: Gianni Davito (2)
1987: Daniele Pagani
1988: Luca Toso (2)
1989: Marcello Benvenuti
1990: Daniele Pagani (2)
1991: Fabrizio Borellini
1992: Roberto Ferrari
1993: Ettore Ceresoli
1994: Roberto Ferrari (2)
1995: Ettore Ceresoli (2)
1996: Alessandro Canale
1997: Alessandro Canale (2)
1998: Ivan Bernasconi
1999: Ivan Bernasconi (2)
2000: Alessandro Talotti
2001: Giulio Ciotti
2002: Giulio Ciotti (2)
2003: Andrea Bettinelli
2004: Alessandro Talotti (2)
2005: Nicola Ciotti
2006: Giulio Ciotti (3)
2007: Filippo Campioli
2008: Filippo Campioli (2)
2009: Nicola Ciotti (2)
2010: Filippo Campioli
2011: Silvano Chesani (3)
2012: Gianmarco Tamberi
2013: Marco Fassinotti
2014: Gianmarco Tamberi (2)
2015: Marco Fassinotti (2)
2016: Gianmarco Tamberi (3)
2017: Eugenio Meloni 
2018: Gianmarco Tamberi (4)
2019: Stefano Sottile 
2020: Gianmarco Tamberi (5)
2021: Marco Fassinotti (3)
2022: Gianmarco Tamberi (6)

Pole vault

1913: Francesco Ventura
1914: Giacomo Erba
1915–1918: not held
1919: Alfonso Butti
1920: Giacinto Lambiasi
1921: Giacinto Lambiasi
1922: Adolfo Contoli
1923: Emilio Pagetti
1924: Giacinto Lambiasi
1925: Giacinto Lambiasi
1926: Giacinto Lambiasi
1927: Danilo Innocenti
1928: Danilo Innocenti
1929: Giacinto Lambiasi
1930: Danilo Innocenti
1931: Danilo Innocenti
1932: Danilo Innocenti
1933: Danilo Innocenti
1934: Danilo Innocenti
1935: Danilo Innocenti
1936: Danilo Innocenti
1937: Danilo Innocenti
1938: Mario Romeo
1939: Mario Romeo
1940: Umberto Ballerini
1941: Dino Conchi
1942: Dino Conchi
1943: Mario Romeo
1944: not held
1945: Mario Romeo
1946: Felice Corti
1947: Mario Romeo
1948: Carlo Rinaldi
1949: Franco Fano
1950: Mario Romeo
1951: Giulio Chiesa
1952: Edmondo Ballotta
1953: Giulio Chiesa
1954: Edmondo Ballotta
1955: Edmondo Ballotta
1956: Edmondo Ballotta
1957: Edmondo Ballotta
1958: Edmondo Ballotta
1959: Giulio Chiesa
1960: Angelo Baronchelli
1961: Mario Gaspari
1962: Pietro Scaglia
1963: Franco Sar
1964: Renato Dionisi
1965: Renato Dionisi
1966: Renato Dionisi
1967: Renato Dionisi
1968: Renato Dionisi
1969: Renato Dionisi
1970: Renato Dionisi
1971: Renato Dionisi
1972: Silvio Fraquelli
1973: Silvio Fraquelli
1974: Silvio Fraquelli
1975: Silvio Fraquelli
1976: Silvio Fraquelli
1977: Renato Dionisi
1978: Renato Dionisi
1979: Domenico D'Alisera
1980: Vincenzo Bellone
1981: Vincenzo Bellone
1982: Mauro Barella
1983: Corrado Alagona
1984: Mauro Barella
1985: Mauro Barella
1986: Gianni Stecchi
1987: Gianni Stecchi
1988: Marco Andreini
1989: Marco Andreini
1990: Gianni Iapichino
1991: Gianni Iapichino
1992: Gianni Iapichino
1993: Massimo Allevi
1994: Andrea Pegoraro
1995: Andrea Pegoraro
1996: Claudio Avogaro
1997: Fabio Pizzolato
1998: Andrea Giannini
1999: Maurilio Mariani
2000: Maurilio Mariani
2001: Ruben Scotti
2002: Ruben Scotti
2003: Fabio Pizzolato
2004: Maurilio Mariani
2005: Giorgio Piantella 
2006: Giorgio Piantella 
2007: Matteo Rubbiani
2008: Giorgio Piantella 
2009: Giorgio Piantella 
2010: Giorgio Piantella 
2011: Sergio D'Orio
2012: Claudio Stecchi
2013: Claudio Stecchi 
2014: Giorgio Piantella 
2015: Claudio Stecchi
2016: Giorgio Piantella 
2017: Giorgio Piantella 
2018: Claudio Stecchi
2019: Max Mandusic
2020: Max Mandusic
2021: Ivan De Angelis
2022: Max Mandusic

Shot put

1913: Giuseppe Tugnoli
1914: Giuseppe Tugnoli
1915–1918: not held	
1919: Aurelio Lenzi
1920: Giuseppe Tugnoli
1921: Aurelio Lenzi
1922: Oprando Bottura
1923: Giuseppe Tugnoli
1924: Albino Pighi
1925: Albino Pighi
1926: Albino Pighi
1927: Clemente Romanò
1928: Albino Pighi
1929: Natale Mosca
1930: Albino Pighi
1931: Albino Pighi
1932: not held	
1933: Cesare Garulli
1934: Lauro Bononcini
1935: Lauro Bononcini
1936: Gianni Reggio
1937: Ruggero Biancani
1938: Angiolo Profeti
1939: Angiolo Profeti
1940: Angiolo Profeti
1941: Angiolo Profeti
1942: Angiolo Profeti
1943: Enea Bertocchi
1944: not held	
1945: Angiolo Profeti
1946: Angiolo Profeti
1947: Angiolo Profeti
1948: Angiolo Profeti
1949: Angiolo Profeti
1950: Angiolo Profeti
1951: Angiolo Profeti
1952: Angiolo Profeti
1953: Angiolo Profeti
1954: Angiolo Profeti
1955: Silvano Meconi
1956: Silvano Meconi
1957: Silvano Meconi
1958: Silvano Meconi
1959: Silvano Meconi
1960: Silvano Meconi
1961: Silvano Meconi
1962: Silvano Meconi
1963: Silvano Meconi
1964: Silvano Meconi
1965: Silvano Meconi
1966: Michele Sorrenti
1967: Silvano Meconi
1968: Silvano Meconi
1969: Flavio Asta
1970: Renato Bergonzoni
1971: Renato Bergonzoni
1972: Michele Sorrenti
1973: Michele Sorrenti
1974: Flavio Asta
1975: Angelo Groppelli
1976: Marco Montelatici
1977: Marco Montelatici
1978: Angelo Groppelli
1979: Angelo Groppelli
1980: Angelo Groppelli
1981: Luigi De Santis
1982: Marco Montelatici
1983: Alessandro Andrei
1984: Alessandro Andrei
1985: Alessandro Andrei
1986: Alessandro Andrei
1987: Marco Montelatici
1988: Marco Montelatici
1989: Alessandro Andrei
1990: Alessandro Andrei
1991: Alessandro Andrei
1992: Alessandro Andrei
1993: Luciano Zerbini
1994: Paolo Dal Soglio
1995: Paolo Dal Soglio
1996: Paolo Dal Soglio
1997: Corrado Fantini
1998: Paolo Dal Soglio
1999: Paolo Dal Soglio
2000: Paolo Dal Soglio
2001: Paolo Dal Soglio
2002: Paolo Dal Soglio
2003: Paolo Dal Soglio
2004: Paolo Dal Soglio
2005: Marco Dodoni
2006: Paolo Capponi
2007: Paolo Capponi
2008: Paolo Capponi
2009: Marco Di Maggio
2010: Andrea Ricci
2011: Paolo Dal Soglio
2012: Paolo Dal Soglio
2013: Marco Dodoni
2014: Daniele Secci
2015: Daniele Secci
2016: Sebastiano Bianchetti
2017: Sebastiano Bianchetti
2018: Sebastiano Bianchetti
2019: Leonardo Fabbri
2020: Leonardo Fabbri
2021: Nick Ponzio
2022: Nick Ponzio

Discus throw

1913: Aurelio Lenzi
1914: Giuseppe Tugnoli
1915–1918: not held
1919: Aurelio Lenzi
1920: Bruno De Lorenzi
1921: Aurelio Lenzi
1922: Giuseppe Tugnoli
1923: Giuseppe Tugnoli
1924: Albino Pighi
1925: Albino Pighi
1926: Albino Pighi
1927: Camillo Zemi
1928: Albino Pighi
1929: Camillo Zemi
1930: Albino Pighi
1931: Albino Pighi
1932: Benvenuto Mignani
1933: Luigi Ponzoni
1934: Giorgio Oberweger
1935: Ruggero Biancani
1936: Giorgio Oberweger
1937: Giorgio Oberweger
1938: Giorgio Oberweger
1939: Adolfo Consolini
1940: Angiolo Profeti
1941: Adolfo Consolini
1942: Adolfo Consolini
1943: Giuseppe Tosi
1944: not held
1945: Adolfo Consolini
1946: Giuseppe Tosi
1947: Giuseppe Tosi
1948: Giuseppe Tosi
1949: Adolfo Consolini
1950: Adolfo Consolini
1951: Giuseppe Tosi
1952: Adolfo Consolini
1953: Adolfo Consolini
1954: Adolfo Consolini
1955: Adolfo Consolini
1956: Adolfo Consolini
1957: Adolfo Consolini
1958: Adolfo Consolini
1959: Adolfo Consolini
1960: Adolfo Consolini
1961: Carmelo Rado
1962: Gaetano Dalla Pria
1963: Franco Grossi
1964: Gaetano Dalla Pria
1965: Franco Grossi
1966: Silvano Simeon
1967: Silvano Simeon
1968: Gilberto Ferrini
1969: Silvano Simeon
1970: Silvano Simeon
1971: Silvano Simeon
1972: Silvano Simeon
1973: Silvano Simeon
1974: Silvano Simeon
1975: Armando De Vincentiis
1976: Armando De Vincentiis
1977: Silvano Simeon
1978: Armando De Vincentiis
1979: Silvano Simeon
1980: Armando De Vincentiis
1981: Armando De Vincentiis
1982: Marco Bucci
1983: Marco Martino
1984: Marco Bucci
1985: Domenico Polato
1986: Marco Martino
1987: Marco Martino
1988: Marco Martino
1989: Luciano Zerbini
1990: Marco Martino
1991: Marco Martino
1992: Luciano Zerbini
1993: Luciano Zerbini
1994: Diego Fortuna
1995: Diego Fortuna
1996: Alessandro Urlando
1997: Diego Fortuna
1998: Diego Fortuna
1999: Diego Fortuna
2000: Diego Fortuna
2001: Diego Fortuna
2002: Cristiano Andrei
2003: Cristiano Andrei
2004: Diego Fortuna
2005: Hannes Kirchler
2006: Hannes Kirchler
2007: Hannes Kirchler
2008: Hannes Kirchler
2009: Hannes Kirchler
2010: Hannes Kirchler
2011: Giovanni Faloci
2012: Eduardo Albertazzi
2013: Giovanni Faloci
2014: Hannes Kirchler
2015: Hannes Kirchler
2016: Hannes Kirchler
2017: Hannes Kirchler
2018: Giovanni Faloci
2019: Giovanni Faloci
2020: Giovanni Faloci 
2021: Giovanni Faloci 
2022: Alessio Mannucci

Javelin throw

1921: Carlo Clemente
1922: Carlo Clemente
1923: Carlo Clemente
1924: Carlo Clemente
1925: Giuseppe Palmieri
1926: Antonio Capecchi
1927: Antonio Capecchi
1928: Alberto Dominutti
1929: Giuseppe Palmieri
1930: Alberto Dominutti
1931: Alberto Dominutti
1932: Mario Agosti
1933: Luigi Spazzali
1934: Bruno Testa
1935: Mario Agosti
1936: Mario Agosti
1937: Bruno Testa
1938: Bruno Testa
1939: Raffaele Drei
1940: Bruno Rossi
1941: Bruno Rossi
1942: Amos Matteucci
1943: Raffaele Drei
1944: not held
1945: Amos Matteucci
1946: Amos Matteucci
1947: Bruno Rossi
1948: Amos Matteucci
1949: Amos Matteucci
1950: Amos Matteucci
1951: Amos Matteucci
1952: Amos Matteucci
1953: Gianluigi Farina
1954: Francesco Ziggiotti
1955: Raffaele Bonaiuto
1956: Giovanni Lievore
1957: Carlo Lievore
1958: Giovanni Lievore
1959: Carlo Lievore
1960: Carlo Lievore
1961: Carlo Lievore
1962: Franco Radman
1963: Vanni Rodeghiero
1964: Carlo Lievore
1965: Vanni Rodeghiero
1966: Vanni Rodeghiero
1967: Franco Radman
1968: Vanni Rodeghiero
1969: Carlo Lievore
1970: Renzo Cramerotti
1971: Renzo Cramerotti
1972: Renzo Cramerotti
1973: Renzo Cramerotti
1974: Vanni Rodeghiero
1975: Renzo Cramerotti
1976: Renzo Cramerotti
1977: Renzo Cramerotti
1978: Vanni Rodeghiero
1979: Vincenzo Marchetti
1980: Vanni Rodeghiero
1981: Agostino Ghesini
1982: Agostino Ghesini
1983: Agostino Ghesini
1984: Agostino Ghesini
1985: Fabio Michielon
1986: Agostino Ghesini
1987: Fabio De Gaspari
1988: Fabio De Gaspari
1989: Fabio De Gaspari
1990: Fabio De Gaspari
1991: Fabio De Gaspari
1992: Fabio De Gaspari
1993: Fabio De Gaspari
1994: Carlo Sonego
1995: Ivan Soffiato
1996: Fabio De Gaspari
1997: Fabio De Gaspari
1998: Armin Kerer
1999: Carlo Sonego
2000: Armin Kerer
2001: Alberto Desiderio
2002: Paolo Valt
2003: Francesco Pignata
2004: Francesco Pignata
2005: Francesco Pignata
2006: Francesco Pignata
2007: Daniele Crivellaro
2008: Roberto Bertolini
2009: Roberto Bertolini
2010: Roberto Bertolini
2011: Leonardo Gottardo
2012: Giacomo Puccini
2013: Norbert Bonvecchio
2014: Norbert Bonvecchio
2014: Roberto Bertolini
2016: Norbert Bonvecchio
2017: Mauro Fraresso
2018: Mauro Fraresso
2019: Mauro Fraresso (3)
2020: Norbert Bonvecchio (4)
2021: Roberto Orlando
2022: Roberto Orlando

Hammer throw

1920: Giovanbattista Berardi
1921: Pietro Nava
1922: Pietro Nava
1923: Pietro Nava
1924: Camillo Zemi
1925: Camillo Zemi
1926: Armando Poggioli
1927: Armando Poggioli
1928: Armando Poggioli
1929: Armando Poggioli
1930: Armando Poggioli
1931: Fernando Vandelli
1932: Fernando Vandelli
1933: Fernando Vandelli
1934: Fernando Vandelli
1935: Giovanni Cantagalli
1936: Giovanni Cantagalli
1937: Giovanni Cantagalli
1938: Giovanni Cantagalli
1939: Teseo Taddia
1940: Vladimiro Superina
1941: Teseo Taddia
1942: Teseo Taddia
1943: Teseo Taddia
1944: not held
1945: Teseo Taddia
1946: Giuseppe Soldi
1947: Teseo Taddia
1948: Teseo Taddia
1949: Teseo Taddia
1950: Teseo Taddia
1951: Teseo Taddia
1952: Danilo Cereali
1953: Teseo Taddia
1954: Teseo Taddia
1955: Teseo Taddia
1956: Teseo Taddia
1957: Silvano Giovanetti
1958: Avio Lucioli
1959: Manlio Cristin
1960: Ennio Boschini
1961: Manlio Cristin
1962: Ennio Boschini
1963: Ennio Boschini
1964: Manlio Cristin
1965: Walter Bernardini
1966: Walter Bernardini
1967: Giampaolo Urlando
1968: Walter Bernardini
1969: Faustino De Boni
1970: Mario Vecchiato
1971: Mario Vecchiato
1972: Mario Vecchiato
1973: Orlando Barbolini
1974: Faustino De Boni
1975: Giampaolo Urlando
1976: Giampaolo Urlando
1977: Giampaolo Urlando
1978: Giampaolo Urlando
1979: Giampaolo Urlando
1980: Giampaolo Urlando
1981: Giampaolo Urlando
1982: Giampaolo Urlando
1983: Giampaolo Urlando
1984: Lucio Serrani
1985: Orlando Bianchini
1986: Lucio Serrani
1987: Lucio Serrani
1988: Lucio Serrani
1989: Enrico Sgrulletti
1990: Enrico Sgrulletti
1991: Lucio Serrani
1992: Enrico Sgrulletti
1993: Enrico Sgrulletti
1994: Enrico Sgrulletti
1995: Enrico Sgrulletti
1996: Enrico Sgrulletti
1997: Loris Paoluzzi
1998: Nicola Vizzoni
1999: Loris Paoluzzi
2000: Nicola Vizzoni
2001: Nicola Vizzoni
2002: Nicola Vizzoni
2003: Nicola Vizzoni
2004: Nicola Vizzoni
2005: Nicola Vizzoni
2006: Nicola Vizzoni
2007: Nicola Vizzoni
2008: Marco Lingua
2009: Nicola Vizzoni
2010: Nicola Vizzoni
2011: Nicola Vizzoni
2012: Lorenzo Povegliano
2013: Nicola Vizzoni
2014: Nicola Vizzoni
2015: Marco Bortolato
2016: Marco Lingua
2017: Marco Lingua
2018: Marco Lingua
2019: Marco Lingua
2020: Marco Lingua
2021: Marco Lingua
2022: Simone Falloni

Combined (Decathlon)

1960: Franco Sar
1961: Franco Sar
1962: Franco Sar
1963: Franco Sar
1964: Franco Sar
1965: Franco Sar
1966: Sergio Rossetti
1967: Bruno Poserina
1968: Sergio Rossetti
1969: Sergio Rossetti
1970: Sergio Rossetti
1971: Sergio Rossetti
1972: Giovanni Modena
1973: Daniele Faraggiana
1974: Mauro Bettela
1975: Giovanni Modena
1976: Daniele Faraggiana
1977: Giovanni Modena
1978: Hubert Indra
1979: Marco Nebiolo
1980: Hubert Indra
1981: Alessandro Brogini
1982: Antonio Iacocca
1983: Hubert Indra
1984: Moreno Martini
1985: Marco Rossi
1986: Marco Rossi
1987: Moreno Martini
1988: Marco Rossi
1989: Fabio Pacori
1990: Luciano Asta
1991: Marco Baffi
1992: Marco Baffi
1993: Ubaldo Ranzi
1994: Beniamino Poserina
1995: Beniamino Poserina
1996: Beniamino Poserina
1997: Beniamino Poserina
1998: Stefano Cellario
1999: Cristian Gasparro
2000: Beniamino Poserina
2001: William Frullani
2002: Paolo Casarsa
2003: Paolo Casarsa
2004: Paolo Mottadelli
2005: Paolo Mottadelli
2006: William Frullani
2007: Paolo Mottadelli
2008: Paolo Mottadelli
2009: Paolo Mottadelli
2010: William Frullani
2011: Paolo Mottadelli
2012: William Frullani
2013: Michele Calvi
2014: Michele Calvi
2015: Simone Cairoli
2016: Simone Cairoli
2017: Jacopo Zanatta
2018: Luca Di Tizio
2019: Matteo Taviani
2020: Dario Dester
2021: Lorenzo Modugno

Women

Track

100 metres

1927: Luigia Bonfanti
1928: Margherita Scolari
1929: not held
1930: Giovanna Viarengo
1931: Giovanna Viarengo (2)
1932: Claudia Testoni
1933: Ondina Valla 
1934: Fernanda Bullano 
1935: Fernanda Bullano (2)
1936: Ondina Valla (2)
1937: Claudia Testoni (2)
1938: Maria Alfero
1939: Italia Lucchini
1940: Claudia Testoni (3)
1941: Italia Lucchini (2)
1942: Italia Lucchini (3)
1943: Ines Bessanello
1944–1945: not held
1946: Mirella Avalle
1947: Mirella Avalle (2)
1948: Liliana Tagliaferri
1949: Liliana Tagliaferri (2)
1950: Laura Sivi
1951: Vittoria Cesarini
1952: Giuseppina Leone
1953: Giuseppina Leone (2)
1954: Giuseppina Leone (3)
1955: Giuseppina Leone (4)
1956: Giuseppina Leone (5)
1957: Giuseppina Leone (6)
1958: Giuseppina Leone (7)
1959: Giuseppina Leone (8)
1960: Giuseppina Leone (9)
1961: Donata Govoni
1962: Donata Govoni (2)
1963: Donata Govoni (3)
1964: Giovanna Carboncini
1965: Donata Govoni (4)
1966: Donata Govoni (5)
1967: Donata Govoni (6)
1968: Cecilia Molinari
1969: Donata Govoni (7)
1970: Cecilia Molinari (2)
1971: Cecilia Molinari (3)
1972: Cecilia Molinari (4)
1973: Cecilia Molinari (5)
1974: Cecilia Molinari (6)
1975: Rita Bottiglieri
1976: Rita Bottiglieri (2)
1977: Rita Bottiglieri (3)
1978: Laura Miano
1979: Laura Miano (2)
1980: Marisa Masullo
1981: Marisa Masullo (2)
1982: Marisa Masullo (3)
1983: Marisa Masullo (4)
1984: Marisa Masullo (5)
1985: Marisa Masullo (6)
1986: Rossella Tarolo
1987: Marisa Masullo (7)
1988: Marisa Masullo (8)
1989: Sonia Vigati
1990: Marisa Masullo (9)
1991: Marisa Masullo (10)
1992: Marisa Masullo (11)
1993: Giada Gallina
1994: Giada Gallina (2)
1995: Giada Gallina (3)
1996: Maria Ruggeri
1997: Giada Gallina (4)
1998: Elena Sordelli
1999: Manuela Levorato
2000: Francesca Cola
2001: Manuela Levorato (2)
2002: Manuela Levorato (3)
2003: Daniela Graglia
2004: Vincenza Calì
2005: Vincenza Calì (2)
2006: Elena Sordelli (2)
2007: Anita Pistone
2008: Anita Pistone (2)
2009: Anita Pistone (3)
2010: Manuela Levorato (4)
2011: Ilenia Draisci
2012: Audrey Alloh
2013: Gloria Hooper 
2014: Irene Siragusa 
2015: Gloria Hooper 
2016: Gloria Hooper 
2017: Irene Siragusa 
2018: Johanelis Herrera
2019: Zaynab Dosso 
2020: Zaynab Dosso (2)
2021: Anna Bongiorni
2022: Zaynab Dosso (3)

200 metres

1930: Maria Bravin
1931: Nives De Grassi 
1932: Maria Coselli
1933: Claudia Testoni
1934: Claudia Testoni (2) 
1935: Livia Michiels
1936: Gina Varetto
1937: Fernanda Bullano 
1938: Ita Penzo
1939: Rosetta Cattaneo
1940: Rosetta Cattaneo (2)
1941: Ester Meneghello
1942: Rosetta Cattaneo (3)
1943: Rosetta Cattaneo (4)
1944–1945: not held
1946: Anna Maria Cantù
1947: Anna Maria Cantù (2)
1948: Mirella Avalle
1949: Marisa Rossi
1950: Laura Sivi
1951: Vittoria Cesarini
1952: Giuseppina Leone
1953: Giuseppina Leone (2)
1954: Giuseppina Leone (3)
1955: Giuseppina Leone (4)
1956: Giuseppina Leone (5)
1957: Giuseppina Leone (6)
1958: Giuseppina Leone (7)
1959: Giuseppina Leone (8)
1960: Giuseppina Leone (9)
1961: Donata Govoni
1962: Letizia Bertoni
1963: Donata Govoni (2)
1964: Giovanna Carboncini
1965: Donata Govoni (3)
1966: Donata Govoni (4)
1967: Donata Govoni (5)
1968: Michela Poggipollini
1969: Maria Bruni
1970: Maria Bruni (2)
1971: Maddalena Grassano
1972: Laura Nappi
1973: Laura Nappi (2)
1974: Laura Nappi (3)
1975: Rita Bottiglieri
1976: Rita Bottiglieri (2)
1977: Rita Bottiglieri (3)
1978: Marisa Masullo
1979: Patrizia Lombardo
1980: Marisa Masullo (2)
1981: Marisa Masullo (3)
1982: Marisa Masullo (4)
1983: Marisa Masullo (5)
1984: Carla Mercurio
1985: Marisa Masullo (6)
1986: Daniela Ferrian
1987: Marisa Masullo (7)
1988: Marisa Masullo (8)
1989: Rossella Tarolo
1990: Marisa Masullo (9)
1991: Rossella Tarolo (2)
1992: Marisa Masullo (10)
1993: Giada Gallina
1994: Giada Gallina (2)
1995: Giada Gallina (3)
1996: Virna De Angeli
1997: Virna De Angeli (2)
1998: Elena Apollonio
1999: Danielle Perpoli
2000: Danielle Perpoli
2001: Manuela Levorato
2002: Daniela Graglia
2003: Daniela Graglia (2)
2004: Vincenza Calì
2005: Vincenza Calì (2)
2006: Daniela Graglia (3)
2007: Anita Pistone
2008: Vincenza Calì (3)
2009: Giulia Arcioni
2010: Giulia Arcioni (2)
2011: Marzia Caravelli
2012: Libania Grenot
2013: Marzia Caravelli
2014: Irene Siragusa 
2015: Gloria Hooper 
2016: Gloria Hooper 
2017: Gloria Hooper 
2018: Irene Siragusa 
2019: Gloria Hooper 
2020: Dalia Kaddari
2021: Dalia Kaddari
2022: Dalia Kaddari

400 metres

1925: Bruna Pizzini
1927: Bruna Pizzini (2)
1927: not held
1928: Giannina Marchini
1929: Maria Bravini
1930–1956: not held
1957: Delma Savorelli
1958: Delma Savorelli (2)
1959: Danila Costa
1960: Danila Costa (2)
1961: Maria La Barbera
1962: Delma Savorelli (3)
1963: Armida Guzzetti
1964: Luisa Cesari
1965: Paola Pigni
1966: Donata Govoni
1967: Paola Pigni (2)
1968: Donata Govoni (2)
1969: Donata Govoni (3)
1970: Armida Giumanini
1971: Donata Govoni (4)
1972: Silvana Zangirolami
1973: Donata Govoni (5)
1974: Donata Govoni (6)
1975: Donata Govoni (7)
1976: Erica Rossi
1977: Erica Rossi (2)
1978: Erica Rossi (3)
1979: Erica Rossi (4)
1980: Erica Rossi (5)
1981: Erica Rossi (6)
1982: Erica Rossi (7)
1983: Erica Rossi (8)
1984: Erica Rossi (9)
1985: Erica Rossi (10)
1986: Cosetta Campana
1987: Erica Rossi (11)
1988: Rossana Morabito
1989: Rossana Morabito (2)
1990: Irmgard Trojer
1991: Roberta Rabaioli
1992: Cosetta Campana (2)
1993: Francesca Carbone
1994: Patrizia Spuri
1995: Danielle Perpoli
1996: Patrizia Spuri (2)
1997: Patrizia Spuri (3)
1998: Patrizia Spuri (4)
1999: Virna De Angeli
2000: Daniela Graglia
2001: Daniela Graglia (2)
2002: Danielle Perpoli (2)
2003: Virna De Angeli (2)
2004: Virna De Angeli (3)
2005: Daniela Reina
2006: Daniela Reina (2)
2007: Daniela Reina (3)
2008: Daniela Reina (4)
2009: Libania Grenot
2010: Libania Grenot (2)
2011: Marta Milani
2012: Maria Enrica Spacca
2013: Chiara Bazzoni
2014: Libania Grenot 
2015: Libania Grenot 
2016: Libania Grenot 
2017: Benedicta Chigbolu 
2018: Raphaela Lukudo 
2019: Giancarla Trevisan 
2020: Alice Mangione
2021: Alice Mangione
2022: Alice Mangione

800 metres

1924: Amelia Schenone
1925: not held
1926: Emilia Pedrazzini
1927: Emilia Pedrazzini (2)
1928–1929: not held
1930: Leandrina Bulzacchi
1931: Leandrina Bulzacchi (2)
1932–1933:  not held
1934: Leandrina Bulzacchi (3)
1935: Leandrina Bulzacchi (4)
1936: Leandrina Bulzacchi (5)
1937: Leandrina Bulzacchi (6)
1938: Leandrina Bulzacchi (7)
1939: Cleo Balbo
1940: Livia Galimberti 
1941: Livia Galimberti (2)
1942: Nilla Tonani
1943: Brunilde Leone
1944–1945: not held
1946: Eralda Zucchetti
1947: Nilla Tonani (2)
1948: Nilla Tonani (3)
1949: Loredana Simonetti
1950: Loredana Simonetti (2)
1951: Loredana Simonetti (3)
1952: Loredana Simonetti (4)
1953: Loredana Simonetti (5)
1954: Loredana Simonetti (6)
1955: Maria Albano
1956: Vita Virgilio
1957: Vita Virgilio (2)
1958: Gilda Jannaccone 
1959: Gilda Jannaccone (2)
1960: Gilda Jannaccone (3)
1961: Gilda Jannaccone (4)
1962: Gilda Jannaccone (5)
1963: Gilda Jannaccone (6)
1964: Silvana Acquarone
1965: Paola Pigni
1966: Paola Pigni (2)
1967: Paola Pigni (3)
1968: Paola Pigni (4)
1969: Paola Pigni (5)
1970: Donata Govoni
1971: Angela Ramello
1972: Donata Govoni (2)
1973: Paola Pigni (6)
1974: Gabriella Dorio
1975: Gabriella Dorio (2)
1976: Gabriella Dorio (3)
1977: Alma Pescalli
1978: Agnese Possamai
1979: Agnese Possamai (2)
1980: Gabriella Dorio (4)
1981: Gabriella Dorio (5)
1982: Gabriella Dorio (6)
1983: Gabriella Dorio (7)
1984: Nicoletta Tozzi
1985: Erica Rossi
1986: Nicoletta Tozzi (2)
1987: Nicoletta Tozzi (3)
1988: Nicoletta Tozzi (4)
1989: Nicoletta Tozzi (5)
1990: Nicoletta Tozzi (6)
1991: Fabia Trabaldo
1992: Nadia Falvo
1993: Nicoletta Tozzi (7)
1994: Serenella Sbrissa
1995: Eleonora Berlanda
1996: Serenella Sbrissa (2)
1997: Claudia Salvarani
1998: Claudia Salvarani (2)
1999: Patrizia Spuri
2000: Claudia Salvarani (3)
2001: Elisabetta Artuso
2002: Claudia Salvarani (4)
2003: Claudia Salvarani (5)
2004: Elisabetta Artuso (2)
2005: Elisa Cusma
2006: Elisa Cusma (2)
2007: Elisa Cusma (3)
2008: Elisa Cusma (4)
2009: Elisa Cusma (5)
2010: Antonella Riva
2011: Elisabetta Artuso (3)
2012: Marta Milani
2013: Marta Milani (2)
2014: Marta Milani (3)
2015: Marta Zenoni
2016: Yusneysi Santiusti
2017: Yusneysi Santiusti (2)
2018: Irene Baldessari
2019: Eloisa Coiro 
2020: Elena Bellò 
2021: Elena Bellò (2)
2022: Eloisa Coiro (2)

1500 metres

1969: Angela Ramello
1970: Paola Pigni
1971: Zina Boniolo
1972: Paola Pigni (2)
1973: Gabriella Dorio
1974: Paola Pigni (3)
1975: Paola Pigni (4)
1976: Gabriella Dorio
1977: Gabriella Dorio (2)
1978: Gabriella Dorio (3)
1979: Gabriella Dorio (4)
1980: Gabriella Dorio (5)
1981: Gabriella Dorio (6)
1982: Gabriella Dorio (7)
1983: Gabriella Dorio (8)
1984: Gabriella Dorio (9)
1985: Roberta Brunet
1986: Roberta Brunet (2)
1987: Betty Molteni
1988: Roberta Brunet (3)
1989: Roberta Brunet (4)
1990: Roberta Brunet (5)
1991: Fabia Trabaldo
1992: Fabia Trabaldo (2)
1993: Fabia Trabaldo (3)
1994: Serenella Sbrissa
1995: Patrizia Cassard
1996: Serenella Sbrissa (2)
1997: Serenella Sbrissa (3)
1998: Serenella Sbrissa (4)
1999: Ilaria Di Santo
2000: Silvia Basso
2001: Sara Palmas
2002: Sara Palmas (2)
2003: Sara Palmas (3)
2004: Eleonora Berlanda
2005: Eleonora Berlanda (2)
2006: Eleonora Berlanda (3)
2007: Silvia Weissteiner
2008: Maria Vittoria Fontanesi
2009: Elena Romagnolo
2010: Elisa Cusma
2011: Elisa Cusma (2)
2012: Elisa Cusma (3)
2013: Giulia Viola
2014: Federica Del Buono
2015: Margherita Magnani
2016: Margherita Magnani (2)
2017: Giulia Aprile
2018: Giulia Aprile (2)
2019: Marta Zenoni
2020: Eleonora Vandi
2021: Nadia Battocletti 
2022: Ludovica Cavalli

3000/5000 metres
From 1974 to 1994 were held 3000 metres, from 1995 5000 metres.

1972: Bruna Lovisolo
1973: Margherita Gargano
1974: Paola Pigni
1975: Silvana Cruciata
1976: Margherita Gargano
1977: Cristina Tomasini
1978: Silvana Cruciata
1979: Margherita Gargano
1980: Margherita Gargano
1981: Silvana Cruciata
1982: Agnese Possamai
1983: Agnese Possamai
1984: Agnese Possamai
1985: Agnese Possamai
1986: Roberta Brunet
1987: Agnese Possamai
1988: Roberta Brunet
1989: Roberta Brunet
1990: Roberta Brunet
1991: Nadia Dandolo
1992: Roberta Brunet
1993: Valentina Tauceri
1994: Roberta Brunet
1995: Silvia Sommaggio
1996: Roberta Brunet
1997: Lucilla Andreucci
1998: Elisa Rea
1999: Elisa Rea
2000: Roberta Brunet
2001: Elisa Rea
2002: Gloria Marconi
2003: Agata Balsamo
2004: Gloria Marconi
2005: Silvia Weissteiner
2006: Silvia Weissteiner
2007: Claudia Pinna
2008: Elena Romagnolo
2009: Federica Dal Ri
2010: Federica Dal Ri
2011: Silvia Weissteiner
2012: Silvia Weissteiner
2013: Giulia Viola
2014: Giulia Viola
2015: Silvia Weissteiner
2016: Veronica Inglese
2017: Valeria Roffino
2018: Nadia Battocletti
2019: Marta Zenoni
2020: Nadia Battocletti
2021: Anna Arnaudo
2022: Micol Majori

10000 metres

1984: Rita Marchisio
1985: Maria Curatolo (2)
1986: Cristina Tomasini
1987: Maria Curatolo (3)
1988: Maria Curatolo (4)
1989: Maria Curatolo (5)
1990: Orietta Mancia
1991: Maria Guida
1992: Orietta Mancia (2)
1993: Maria Guida (2)
1994: Maria Guida (3)
1995: Maria Guida (4)
1996: Maria Guida (5)
1997: Silvia Sommaggio
1998: Lucilla Andreucci
1999: Agata Balsamo
2000: Silvia Sommaggio (2)
2001: Maria Guida (6)
2002: Maura Viceconte
2003: Gloria Marconi
2004: Vincenza Sicari
2005: Renate Rungger
2006: Gloria Marconi (2)
2007: Gloria Marconi (3)
2008: Rosaria Console
2009: Anna Incerti
2010: Claudia Finielli
2011: Nadia Ejjafini
2012: Federica Dal Ri
2013: Valeria Straneo
2014: Veronica Inglese
2015: Claudia Pinna
2016: Rosaria Console
2017: Sara Dossena
2018: Rosaria Console (2)
2019: Isabel Mattuzzi
2020: Valeria Straneo
2021: Martina Merlo
2022: Anna Arnaudo

80/100 m hurdles

80 metres hurdles
1960: Letizia Bertoni
1961: Letizia Bertoni
1962: Letizia Bertoni
1963: Letizia Bertoni
1964: Letizia Bertoni
1965: Magaly Vettorazzo
1966: Magaly Vettorazzo
1967: Magaly Vettorazzo
1968: Carla Panerai
100 metres hurdles
1969: Magalì Vettorazzo 
1970: Antonella Battaglia
1971: Antonella Battaglia 
1972: Ileana Ongar
1973: Ileana Ongar 
1974: Ileana Ongar 
1975: Ileana Ongar 
1976: Ileana Ongar 
1977: Ileana Ongar 
1978: Ileana Ongar 
1979: Patrizia Lombardo 
1980: Antonella Battaglia
1981: Patrizia Lombardo
1982: Laura Rosati 
1983: Simona Parmiggiani 
1984: Laura Rosati 
1985: Patrizia Lombardo 
1986: Mary Massarin 
1987: Carla Tuzzi
1988: Carla Tuzzi
1989: Carla Tuzzi
1990: Carla Tuzzi
1991: Daniela Morandini 
1992: Daniela Morandini 
1993: Carla Tuzzi
1994: Carla Tuzzi
1995: Carla Tuzzi
1996: Carla Tuzzi
1997: Carla Tuzzi
1998: Anna Maria Di Terlizzi 
1999: Margaret Macchiut
2000: Margaret Macchiut
2001: Margaret Macchiut
2002: Margaret Macchiut
2003: Margaret Macchiut
2004: Margaret Macchiut
2005: Micol Cattaneo
2006: Margaret Macchiut 
2007: Micol Cattaneo
2008: Micol Cattaneo
2009: Micol Cattaneo
2010: Marzia Caravelli 
2011: Marzia Caravelli 
2012: Marzia Caravelli 
2013: Marzia Caravelli 
2014: Marzia Caravelli 
2015: Giulia Tessaro 
2016: Giulia Pennella 
2017: Micol Cattaneo
2018: Luminosa Bogliolo
2019: Luminosa Bogliolo
2020: Luminosa Bogliolo
2021: Luminosa Bogliolo
2022: Elisa Di Lazzaro

400 m hurdles

1977: Giuseppina Cirulli
1978: Giuseppina Cirulli 
1979: Giuseppina Cirulli 
1980: Giuseppina Cirulli 
1981: Giuseppina Cirulli 
1982: Giuseppina Cirulli 
1983: Giuseppina Cirulli 
1984: Giuseppina Cirulli 
1985: Giuseppina Cirulli 
1986: Giuseppina Cirulli 
1987: Irmgard Trojer
1988: Irmgard Trojer
1989: Irmgard Trojer
1990: Irmgard Trojer
1991: Irmgard Trojer
1992: Irmgard Trojer
1993: Elena Zamperioli
1994: Virna De Angeli 
1995: Virna De Angeli
1996: Carla Barbarino 
1997: Carla Barbarino 
1998: Monika Niederstätter
1999: Monika Niederstätter
2000: Monika Niederstätter
2001: Monika Niederstätter
2002: Monika Niederstätter
2003: Monika Niederstätter
2004: Benedetta Ceccarelli 
2005: Benedetta Ceccarelli 
2006: Benedetta Ceccarelli 
2007: Benedetta Ceccarelli 
2008: Benedetta Ceccarelli 
2009: Benedetta Ceccarelli 
2010: Manuela Gentili
2011: Manuela Gentili
2012: Manuela Gentili 
2013: Yadisleidy Pedroso
2014: Yadisleidy Pedroso
2015: Yadisleidy Pedroso
2016: Ayomide Folorunso 
2017: Yadisleidy Pedroso
2018: Yadisleidy Pedroso
2019: Ayomide Folorunso 
2020: Ayomide Folorunso 
2021: Eleonora Marchiando
2022: Ayomide Folorunso

3000 m steeplechase
2001: Pierangela Baronchelli
2002: Emma Quaglia 
2003: Marzena Michalska 
2004: Marzena Michalska 
2005: Elena Romagnolo
2006: Elena Romagnolo
2007: Elena Romagnolo
2008: Emma Quaglia 
2009: Emma Quaglia 
2010: Valentina Costanza 
2011: Valentina Costanza 
2012: Valentina Costanza 
2013: Nicole Reina
2014: Valeria Roffino
2015: Valeria Roffino
2016: Francesca Bertoni 
2017: Francesca Bertoni
2018: Isabel Mattuzzi
2019: Isabel Mattuzzi
2020: Martina Merlo
2021: Martina Merlo
2022: Martina Merlo

Road

10 km road

2010: Agnes Tschurtschenthaler
2011: Valeria Straneo
2012: Valeria Straneo
2013: Veronica Inglese
2014: Laila Soufyane
2015: Anna Incerti
2016: Fatna Maraoui
2017: Fatna Maraoui
2018: Sara Dossena
2019: Fatna Maraoui
2021: not disputed
2021: Sofiia Yaremchuk

Half marathon

1980: Laura Fogli
1981: Alba Milana
1982: Laura Fogli (2)
1983: Rita Marchisio
1984: Rita Marchisio (2)
1985: Anna Villani
1986: Maria Curatolo
1987: Cristina Tomasini
1988: Maria Curatolo (2)
1989: Allison Rabour
1990: Silvana Cuchietti
1991: Anna Villani (2)
1992: Anna Villani (3)
1993: Anna Villani (4)
1994: Maria Guida
1995: Maria Curatolo (3)
1996: Lucilla Andreucci
1997: Lucilla Andreucci (2)
1998: Lucilla Andreucci (3)
1999: Maria Guida (2)
2000: Maura Viceconte
2001: Maura Viceconte (2)
2002: Maria Guida (3)
2003: Rosaria Console
2004: Patrizia Tisi
2005: Bruna Genovese
2006: Gloria Marconi
2007: Anna Incerti
2008: Anna Incerti (2)
2009: Rosaria Console (2)
2010: Rosaria Console (3)
2011: Nadia Ejjafini
2012: Valeria Straneo 
2013: Claudia Pinna
2014: Valeria Straneo (2)
2015: Laila Soufyane
2016: Rosaria Console (4)
2017: Sara Brogiato
2018: Valeria Straneo (3)
2019: Anna Incerti (3)
2020: Valeria Straneo (4)
2021: Giovanna Epis
2022: Sofiia Yaremchuk

Marathon

1980: Maria Pia D'Orlando
1981: Silvana Cruciata
1982: Alba Milana
1983: Alba Milana (2)
1984: Paola Moro
1985: Paola Moro (2)
1986: Paola Moro (3)
1987: Rita Marchisio
1988: Graziella Struli
1989: Emma Scaunich
1990: Emma Scaunich (2)
1991: Emma Scaunich (3)
1992: Emma Scaunich (4)
1993: Emma Scaunich (5)
1994: Maura Viceconte
1995: Maura Viceconte (2)
1996: Franca Fiacconi
1997: Ornella Ferrara
1998: Franca Fiacconi (2)
1999: Sonia Maccioni
2000: Patrizia Ritondo
2001: Patrizia Ritondo (2)
2002: Tiziana Alagia
2003: Anna Incerti
2004: Ornella Ferrara (2)
2005: Ivana Iozzia
2006: Marcella Mancini
2007: Ivana Iozzia (2)
2008: Rosaria Console
2009: Laura Giordano
2010: Marcella Mancini (2)
2011: Martina Celi
2012: Ivana Iozzia (3)
2013: Elisa Stefani
2104: Claudia Gelsomino
2015: Catherine Bertone
2016: Martina Facciani
2017: Federica Dal Ri
2018: Eleonora Gardelli
2019: Martina Facciani 
2020: Giovanna Epis
2021: Arianna Lutteri

5000 m walk
The 5000 m walk race, generally held on the track, was established at the Italian championships in 1981 and ran until 2010.

1981: Paola Pastorini
1982: Giuliana Salce
1983: Giuliana Salce
1984: Giuliana Salce
1985: Maria Grazia Cogoli
1986: Maria Grazia Cogoli
1987: Giuliana Salce
1988: Pier Carola Pagani
1989: Ileana Salvador
1990: Ileana Salvador
1991: Ileana Salvador
1992: Ileana Salvador
1993: Ileana Salvador
1994: Elisabetta Perrone
1995: Annarita Sidoti
1996: Elisabetta Perrone
1997: Elisabetta Perrone
1998: Erica Alfridi
1999: Cristiana Pellino
2000: Cristiana Pellino
2001: Cristiana Pellino
2002: Erica Alfridi
2003: Elisabetta Perrone
2004: Elisa Rigaudo
2005: Sibilla Di Vincenzo
2006: Rossella Giordano
2007: Elisa Rigaudo
2008: Sibilla Di Vincenzo
2009: Sibilla Di Vincenzo
2010: Sibilla Di Vincenzo

10 km walk (10,000 m walk)
In same editions the race was disputed on 10,000 m track.

1984: Giuliana Salce
1985: Maria Grazia Cogoli
1986: Nadia Forestan
1987: Ileana Salvador
1988: Erica Alfridi
1989: Ileana Salvador
1990: Ileana Salvador
1991: Annarita Sidoti
1992: Ileana Salvador
1993: Ileana Salvador
1994: Elisabetta Perrone
1995: Elisabetta Perrone
1996: Rossella Giordano
1997: Erica Alfridi
1998: Rossella Giordano
1999/2010: not held
2011: Federica Ferraro (10,000 m track)
2012: Eleonora Giorgi
2013: Elisa Rigaudo (10,000 m track)
2014: Antonella Palmisano
2015: Elisa Rigaudo
2016: Valentina Trapletti
2017: Eleonora Giorgi (10,000 m track)
2018: Antonella Palmisano
2019: Eleonora Giorgi (10,000 m track)
2020: Antonella Palmisano
2021: Nicole Colombi
2022: Valentina Trapletti

20 km walk

1992: Annarita Sidoti 
1993: Ileana Salvador 
1994: not held
1995: Annarita Sidoti
1996: Erica Alfridi 
1997: Erica Alfridi 
1998: Santa Compagnoni
1999: Erica Alfridi 
2000: Annarita Sidoti 
2001: Elisabetta Perrone 
2002: Annarita Sidoti 
2003: Elisa Rigaudo
2004: Elisa Rigaudo 
2005: Elisa Rigaudo
2006: Gisella Orsini
2007: Gisella Orsini
2008: Elisa Rigaudo 
2009: Valentina Trapletti
2010: Sibilla Di Vincenzo 
2011: Federica Ferraro
2012: Federica Ferraro
2013: Federica Ferraro
2014: Antonella Palmisano
2015: Valentina Trapletti
2016: Sibilla Di Vincenzo
2017: Valentina Trapletti
2018: Valentina Trapletti
2019: Eleonora Dominici
2020: not disputed due Covid
2021: Eleonora Giorgi
2022: Valentina Trapletti

35 km walk
2021: Eleonora Giorgi
2022: Federica Curiazzi

50 km walk
2018: Beatrice Foresti
2019: Nicole Colombi
2020: not disputed due Covid

Field

Long jump

1923: Maria Piantanida 
1924: Maria Piantanida 
1925: Andreina Sacco 
1926: Luigia Bonfanti 
1927: Vittorina Vivenza 
1928: Derna Polazzo 
1929: not held
1930: Giovanna Viarengo
1931: Claudia Testoni
1932: Claudia Testoni
1933: Claudia Testoni
1934: Claudia Testoni
1935: Claudia Testoni
1936: Jolanda Colombo
1937: Claudia Testoni
1938: Claudia Testoni
1939: Amelia Piccinini
1940: Amelia Piccinini
1941: Lidia Zanuttigh
1942: Elda Franco
1943: Amelia Piccinini
1944: not held
1945: Amelia Piccinini
1946: Amelia Piccinini
1947: Lidia Zanuttigh
1948: Silvana Pierucci
1949: Silvana Pierucci
1950: Silvana Pierucci
1951: Silvana Pierucci
1952: Maria Gabriella Pinto
1953: Maria Gabriella Pinto
1954: Maria Musso
1955: Piera Fassio
1956: Piera Fassio
1957: Piera Fassio
1958: Piera Fassio
1959: Piera Tizzoni
1960: Piera Tizzoni
1961: Magaly Vettorazzo
1962: Magaly Vettorazzo
1963: Magaly Vettorazzo
1964: Magaly Vettorazzo
1965: Maria Vittoria Trio
1966: Magaly Vettorazzo
1967: Magaly Vettorazzo
1968: Maria Vittoria Trio
1969: Magaly Vettorazzo
1970: Mariella Baucia
1971: Barbara Ridi
1972: Barbara Ridi
1973: Manuela Martinelli
1974: Ambra Colombo
1975: Laura Santini
1976: Laura Nappi
1977: Graziella Clemente
1978: Emanuela Nini
1979: Barbara Norello
1980: Giusy Albanese
1981: Elena Cafaro
1982: Alessandra Oldani
1983: Alessandra Becatti
1984: Antonella Capriotti
1985: Antonella Capriotti
1986: Antonella Capriotti
1987: Antonella Capriotti
1988: Antonella Capriotti
1989: Antonella Capriotti
1990: Antonella Capriotti
1991: Valentina Uccheddu
1992: Valentina Uccheddu
1993: Antonella Capriotti
1994: Fiona May
1995: Valentina Uccheddu
1996: Fiona May
1997: Arianna Zivez
1998: Maria Chiara Baccini
1999: Valentina Uccheddu
2000: Laura Gatto
2001: Laura Gatto
2002: Laura Gatto
2003: Thaimi O’Reilly
2004: Laura Gatto
2005: Fiona May
2006: Valeria Canella
2007: Tania Vicenzino
2008: Tania Vicenzino
2009: Tania Vicenzino
2010: Tania Vicenzino
2011: Tania Vicenzino
2012: Tania Vicenzino
2013: Tania Vicenzino
2014: Tania Vicenzino
2015: Martina Lorenzetto
2016: Laura Strati
2017: Laura Strati
2018: Laura Strati
2019: Tania Vicenzino
2020: Larissa Iapichino
2021: Larissa Iapichino
2022: Larissa Iapichino

Triple jump

1990: Anna Maria Bonazza
1991: Antonella Capriotti
1992: Antonella Capriotti
1993: Antonella Capriotti
1994: Barbara Lah
1995: Barbara Lah
1996: Barbara Lah
1997: Antonella Capriotti
1998: Maria Costanza Moroni
1999: Barbara Lah
2000: Silvia Biondini
2001: Silvia Biondini
2002: Magdelín Martínez
2003: Barbara Lah
2004: Simona La Mantia
2005: Simona La Mantia
2006: Simona La Mantia
2007: Magdelín Martínez
2008: Magdelín Martínez
2009: Magdelín Martínez
2010: Simona La Mantia
2011: Simona La Mantia
2012: Simona La Mantia
2013: Simona La Mantia
2014: Dariya Derkach
2015: Ottavia Cestonaro
2016: Dariya Derkach
2017: Dariya Derkach
2018: Ottavia Cestonaro
2019: Ottavia Cestonaro
2020: Dariya Derkach
2021: Dariya Derkach
2022: Dariya Derkach

High jump

1923: Lina Banzi
1924: Andreina Sacco
1925: Andreina Sacco (2)
1926: Lina Banzi (2)
1927: Silia Martini
1928: Silia Martini (2)
1929: Silia Martini (3)
1930: Ondina Valla
1931: Ondina Valla (2)
1932: Maria Cosselli
1933: Ondina Valla (3)
1934: Elsa Lambertini 
1935: Maria Pia Montarino 
1936: Tina Migliasso
1937: Ondina Valla (4)
1938: Modesta Puhar
1939: Elda Franco
1940: Ondina Valla (5)
1941: Sara Aldovandri
1942: Gianna Jannoni
1943: Caterina Gallo
1944–1945: not disputed
1946: Ester Palmesino
1947: Gianna Jannoni (2)
1948: Ester Palmesino (2)
1949: Gianna Jannoni (3)
1950: Gianna Jannoni (4)
1951: Gianna Jannoni (5)
1952: Ester Palmesino (2)
1953: Ester Palmesino (3)
1954: Osvalda Giardi
1955: Paola Paternoster
1956: Osvalda Giardi (2)
1957: Osvalda Giardi (3)
1958: Osvalda Giardi (4)
1959: Marinella Bortoluzzi
1960: Osvalda Giardi (5)
1961: Marinella Bortoluzzi (2)
1962: Osvalda Giardi (6)
1963: Marinella Bortoluzzi (3)
1964: Osvalda Giardi (7)
1965: Gilda Cacciavillani
1966: Osvalda Giardi (8)
1967: Anna Onofri
1968: Annalisa Lanci
1969: Rosa Bellamoli
1970: Sara Simeoni
1971: Sara Simeoni (2)
1972: Sara Simeoni (3)
1973: Sara Simeoni (4)
1974: Sara Simeoni (5)
1975: Sara Simeoni (6)
1976: Sara Simeoni (7)
1977: Sara Simeoni (8)
1978: Sara Simeoni (9)
1979: Sara Simeoni (10)
1980: Sara Simeoni (11)
1981: Sandra Dini
1982: Sara Simeoni (12)
1983: Sara Simeoni (13)
1984: Sandra Dini (2)
1985: Sara Simeoni (14)
1986: Alessandra Fossati
1987: Alessandra Bonfigliolo
1988: Barbara Fiammengo
1989: Roberta Bugarini
1990: Barbara Fiammengo (2)
1991: Barbara Fiammengo (3)
1992: Antonella Bevilacqua
1993: Antonella Bevilacqua (2)
1994: Antonella Bevilacqua (3)
1995: Francesca Sicari
1996: Antonella Bevilacqua (4)
1997: Antonella Bevilacqua (5)
1998: Francesca Bradamante
1999: Daniela Galeotti
2000: Antonietta Di Martino
2001: Antonietta Di Martino (2)
2002: Anna Visigalli
2003: Antonella Bevilacqua (6)
2004: Anna Visigalli (2)
2005: Stefania Cadamuro
2006: Antonietta Di Martino (3)
2007: Antonietta Di Martino (4)
2008: Antonietta Di Martino (5)
2009: Raffaella Lamera
2010: Antonietta Di Martino (6)
2011: Raffaella Lamera (2)
2012: Chiara Vitobello
2013: Alessia Trost
2016: Alessia Trost (2)
2017: Erika Furlani 
2018: Elena Vallortigara 
2019: Alessia Trost (3)
2020: Elena Vallortigara (2)
2021: Elena Vallortigara (3)
2022: Elena Vallortigara (4)

Pole vault

1995: Maria Carla Bresciani
1996: Maria Chiara Romano
1997: Maria Carla Bresciani
1998: Anna Tamburini
1999: Maria Carla Bresciani
2000: Arianna Farfaletti Casali 
2001: Maria Carla Bresciani
2002: Francesca Dolcini
2003: Arianna Farfaletti Casali 
2004: Maria Carla Bresciani
2005: Sara Bruzzese 
2006: Arianna Farfaletti Casali 
2007: Anna Giordano Bruno
2008: Anna Giordano Bruno
2009: Anna Giordano Bruno
2010: Elena Scarpellini 
2011: Anna Giordano Bruno
2012: Anna Giordano Bruno
2013: Giorgia Benecchi
2014: Roberta Bruni 
2015: Sonia Malavisi
2016: Sonia Malavisi 
2017: Elisa Molinarolo 
2018: Roberta Bruni 
2019: Sonia Malavisi 
2020: Roberta Bruni
2021: Elisa Molinarolo 
2022: Roberta Bruni

Shot put

1927: Pierina Borsani
1928: Bruna Bertolini
1929: Bruna Bertolini
1930: Bruna Bertolini
1931: Bruna Bertolini
1932: Bruna Bertolini
1933: Bruna Bertolini
1934: Bruna Bertolini
1934: Bruna Bertolini
1936: Bruna Bertolini
1937: Bruna Bertolini
1938: Giorgina Grossi
1939: Giorgina Grossi
1940: Giorgina Grossi
1941: Amelia Piccinini
1942: Amelia Piccinini
1943: Amelia Piccinini
1944: not held
1945: Amelia Piccinini
1946: Amelia Piccinini
1947: Amelia Piccinini
1948: Amelia Piccinini
1949: Amelia Piccinini
1950: Amelia Piccinini
1951: Amelia Piccinini
1952: Amelia Piccinini
1953: Amelia Piccinini
1954: Amelia Piccinini
1955: Paola Paternoster
1956: Paola Paternoster
1957: Paola Paternoster
1958: Caterina Bedini
1959: Paola Paternoster
1960: Paola Paternoster
1961: Elivia Ricci
1962: Claudia Conti
1963: Elivia Ricci
1964: Elivia Ricci
1965: Elivia Ricci
1966: Elivia Ricci
1967: Silvana Forcellini
1968: Silvana Forcellini
1969: Silvana Forcellini
1970: Silvana Forcellini
1971: Maria Stella Masocco
1972: Maria Stella Masocco
1973: Cinzia Petrucci
1974: Cinzia Petrucci
1975: Cinzia Petrucci
1976: Cinzia Petrucci
1977: Cinzia Petrucci
1978: Cinzia Petrucci
1979: Angela Anzelotti
1980: Cinzia Petrucci
1981: Cinzia Petrucci
1982: Concetta Milanese
1983: Concetta Milanese

1985: Concetta Milanese
1986: Maria Assunta Chiummariello
1987: Maria Assunta Chiummariello
1988: Concetta Milanese
1989: Agnese Maffeis
1990: Agnese Maffeis
1991: Agnese Maffeis
1992: Agnese Maffeis
1993: Agnese Maffeis
1994: Mara Rosolen
1995: Maria Tranchina
1996: Mara Rosolen
1997: Mara Rosolen
1998: Mara Rosolen
1999: Mara Rosolen
2000: Mara Rosolen
2002: Assunta Legnante
2003: Assunta Legnante
2004: Assunta Legnante
2005: Chiara Rosa
2006: Chiara Rosa
2007: Chiara Rosa
2008: Chiara Rosa
2009: Chiara Rosa
2010: Chiara Rosa
2011: Chiara Rosa
2012: Chiara Rosa
2013: Chiara Rosa
2014: Chiara Rosa
2015: Chiara Rosa
2016: Chiara Rosa
2017: Chiara Rosa
2018: Chiara Rosa
2019: Chiara Rosa
2020: Chiara Rosa
2021: Chiara Rosa
2022: Chiara Rosa

Discus throw

1924:Maria Piantanida
1925:Andreina Sacco
1926:not held
1927:Piera Borsani
1928:Vittorina Vivenza
1929:Vittorina Vivenza
1930:Vittorina Vivenza
1931:Piera Borsani
1932:Jolanda Bacchielli
1933:Bruna Bertolini
1934:Bruna Bertolini
1935:Piera Borsani
1936:Nerea Krenn
1937:Gabre Gabric
1938:Serafina Guidi
1939:Gabre Gabric
1940:Gabre Gabric
1941:Gina Tagliapietra
1942:Gabre Gabric
1943:Edera Cordiale
1944–1945:not held
1946:Edera Cordiale
1947:Edera Cordiale
1948:Edera Cordiale
1949:Edera Cordiale
1950:Edera Cordiale
1951:Edera Cordiale
1952:Edera Cordiale
1953:Edera Cordiale
1954:Gianna Nannetti
1955:Paola Paternoster
1956:Paola Paternoster
1957:Paola Paternoster
1958:Elivia Ricci
1959:Elivia Ricci
1960:Elivia Ricci
1961:Elivia Ricci
1962:Elivia Ricci
1963:Elivia Ricci
1964:Elivia Ricci
1965:Elivia Ricci
1966:Elivia Ricci
1967:Franca Pravadelli
1968:Roberta Grottini
1969:Maria Luisa Fancello
1970:Roberta Grottini
1971:Roberta Grottini
1972:Roberta Grottini
1973:Renata Scaglia
1974:Renata Scaglia
1975:Renata Scaglia
1976:Renata Scaglia
1977:Maura Zambon
1978:Renata Scaglia
1979:Maristella Bano
1980:Maristella Bano
1981:Renata Scaglia
1982:Maristella Bano
1983:Maristella Bano
1984:Renata Scaglia
1985:Claudia Paris
1986:Sandra Benedet
1987:Maria Marello
1988:Maria Marello
1989:Agnese Maffeis
1990:Agnese Maffeis
1991:Agnese Maffeis
1992:Agnese Maffeis
1993:Agnese Maffeis
1994:Mara Rosolen
1995:Agnese Maffeis
1996:Agnese Maffeis
1997:Agnese Maffeis
1998:Agnese Maffeis
1999:Mara Rosolen
2000:Agnese Maffeis
2001:Agnese Maffeis
2002:Agnese Maffeis
2003:Agnese Maffeis
2004:Agnese Maffeis
2005:Cristiana Checchi
2006:Laura Bordignon
2007:Cristiana Checchi
2008:Laura Bordignon
2009:Laura Bordignon
2010:Laura Bordignon
2011:Laura Bordignon
2012:Tamara Apostolico
2013:Valentina Aniballi
2014:Valentina Aniballi
2015:Stefania Strumillo
2016:Stefania Strumillo
2017:Stefania Strumillo
2018:Valentina Aniballi
2019:Stefania Strumillo
2020: Daisy Osakue
2021: Daisy Osakue
2022: Daisy Osakue

Javelin throw

1927: Piera Borsani
1928: Matilde Villani
1929: Piera Borsani
1930: Jolanda Bacchelli
1931: Jolanda Bacchelli
1932: Jolanda Bacchelli
1933: Jolanda Bacchelli
1934: Piera Borsani
1935: Piera Borsani
1936: Alma Guidi
1937: Alma Guidi
1938: Caterina Milanesio
1939: Etta Ballaben
1940: Etta Ballaben
1941: Etta Ballaben
1942: Etta Ballaben
1943: Ada Turci
1944:not held
1945: Ada Turci
1946: Ada Turci
1947: Ada Turci
1948: Ada Turci
1949: Ada Turci
1950: Ada Turci
1951: Ada Turci
1952: Ada Turci
1953: Ada Turci
1954: Ada Turci
1955: Ada Turci
1956: Paola Paternoster
1957: Paola Paternoster
1958: Ada Turci
1959: Paola Paternoster
1960: Paola Paternoster
1961: Paola Paternoster
1962: Fernanda Torti
1963: Annamaria Mazzacurati
1964: Elide Riccobono
1965: Elide Riccobono
1966: Annamaria Mazzacurati
1967: Annamaria Mazzacurati
1968: Annamaria Mazzacurati
1969: Annamaria Mazzacurati
1970: Giuliana Amici
1971: Giuliana Amici
1972: Giuliana Amici
1973: Giuliana Amici
1974: Giuliana Amici
1975: Giuliana Amici
1976: Giuliana Amici
1977: Giuliana Amici
1978: Giuliana Amici
1979: Fausta Quintavalla
1980: Fausta Quintavalla
1981: Fausta Quintavalla
1982: Fausta Quintavalla
1983: Fausta Quintavalla
1984: Fausta Quintavalla
1985: Ambra Giacchetti
1986: Fausta Quintavalla
1987: Vilma Vidotto
1988: Stefania Galbiati
1989: Veronica Becuzzi
1990: Fausta Quintavalla
1991: Veronica Becuzzi
1992: Gloria Crippa
1993: Claudia Coslovich
1994: Claudia Coslovich
1995: Claudia Coslovich
1996: Claudia Coslovich
1997: Claudia Coslovich
1998: Claudia Coslovich
1999: Claudia Coslovich
2000: Claudia Coslovich
2001: Claudia Coslovich
2002: Claudia Coslovich
2003: Claudia Coslovich
2004: Elisabetta Marin
2005: Zahra Bani
2006: Zahra Bani
2007: Claudia Coslovich
2008: Claudia Coslovich
2009: Zahra Bani
2010: Zahra Bani
2011: Zahra Bani
2012: Zahra Bani
2013: Sara Jemai
2014: Sara Jemai
2015: Sara Jemai
2016: Eleonora Bacciotti
2017: Zahra Bani
2018: Sara Jemai
2019: Carolina Visca
2020: Carolina Visca
2021: Zahra Bani
2022: Paola Padovan

Hammer throw

1995: Silvia Lazzari
1996: Monica Torazzi
1997: Maria Tranchina
1998: Ester Balassini
1999: Ester Balassini
2000: Ester Balassini
2001: Ester Balassini
2002: Clarissa Claretti
2003: Clarissa Claretti
2004: Alessandra Coaccioli
2005: Ester Balassini
2006: Clarissa Claretti
2007: Clarissa Claretti
2008: Clarissa Claretti
2009: Clarissa Claretti
2010: Silvia Salis
2011: Silvia Salis
2012: Silvia Salis
2013: Micaela Mariani
2014: Micaela Mariani
2015: Silvia Salis
2016: Francesca Massobrio
2017: Sara Fantini
2018: Sara Fantini
2019: Sara Fantini
2020: Sara Fantini
2021: Sara Fantini
2022: Sara Fantini

Combined
Pentathlon

1960: Paola Paternoster
1961: Roberta Turba
1962: Magaly Vettorazzo
1963: Magaly Vettorazzo
1964: Osvalda Giardi
1965: Magaly Vettorazzo
1966: Magaly Vettorazzo
1967: Magaly Vettorazzo
1968: Loredana Fiori
1969: Magaly Vettorazzo
1970: Magaly Vettorazzo
1971: Barbara Ridi
1972: Sara Simeoni
1973: Rita Bottiglieri
1974: Rita Bottiglieri
1975: Loredana Fiori
1976: Anna Aldrighetti
1977: Anna Aldrighetti
1978: Barbara Bachlechner
1979: Barbara Bachlechner
Heptathlon
 1980: Barbara Bachlechner
 1981: Gabriella Pizzolato
 1982: Alessandra Becatti
 1983: Katia Pasquinelli
 1984: Esmeralda Pecchio
 1985: Katia Pasquinelli
 1986: Claudia Del Fabbro
 1987: Stefania Frisiero
 1988: Herta Steiner
 1989: Herta Steiner
 1990: Ifeoma Ozoeze
 1991: Claudia Del Fabbro
 1992: Giuliana Spada
 1993: Giuliana Spada
 1994: Karin Periginelli
 1995: Giuliana Spada
 1996: Giuliana Spada
 1997: Gertrud Bacher
 1998: Gertrud Bacher
 1999: Karin Periginelli
 2000: Karin Periginelli
 2001: Gertrud Bacher
 2002: Gertrud Bacher
 2003: Gertrud Bacher
 2004: Silvia Dalla Piana
 2005: Elisa Trevisan
 2006: Elisa Trevisan
 2007: Elisa Trevisan
 2008: Francesca Doveri
 2009: Cecilia Ricali
 2010: Francesca Doveri
 2011: Elisa Trevisan
 2012: Elisa Trevisan
 2013: Carolina Bianchi
 2014: Flavia Nasella
 2015: Federica Palumbo
 2016: Federica Palumbo
 2017: Sveva Gerevini
 2018: Sveva Gerevini
 2019: Sveva Gerevini
 2020: Sveva Gerevini
 2021: Marta Giovannini
 2022: Marta Giovannini

See also
 List of Italian Athletics Indoor Championships winners
 Italian Cross Country Championships
 Italian 10 km road Championships
 Italian Winter Throwing Championships

References

Champions 1960–2006
Italian Championships. GBR Athletics. Retrieved 2021-01-31.

External links
 

Winners
 List
Italian Championships
Athletics